This list contains a list of EC numbers for the first group, EC 1, oxidoreductases, placed in numerical order as determined by the Nomenclature Committee of the International Union of Biochemistry and Molecular Biology.  All official information is tabulated at the website of the committee. The database is developed and maintained by Andrew McDonald.

EC 1.1 Acting on the CH-OH group of donors

EC 1.1.1 With Nicotinamide adenine dinucleotide or NADP as acceptor

: alcohol dehydrogenase
: alcohol dehydrogenase (NADP+)
: homoserine dehydrogenase
: (R,R)-butanediol dehydrogenase
 EC 1.1.1.5:  acetoin dehydrogenase. Now EC 1.1.1.303, diacetyl reductase [(R)-acetoin forming] and EC 1.1.1.304, diacetyl reductase [(S)-acetoin forming]
: glycerol dehydrogenase
: propanediol-phosphate dehydrogenase
: glycerol-3-phosphate dehydrogenase (NAD+)
: D-xylulose reductase
: L-xylulose reductase
: D-arabinitol 4-dehydrogenase
: L-arabinitol 4-dehydrogenase
: L-arabinitol 2-dehydrogenase
: L-iditol 2-dehydrogenase
: D-iditol 2-dehydrogenase
: galactitol 2-dehydrogenase
: mannitol-1-phosphate 5-dehydrogenase
: inositol 2-dehydrogenase
: glucuronate reductase
: glucuronolactone reductase
: (-)-menthol dehydrogenase
: (+)-neomenthol dehydrogenase

: aldose reductase
: UDP-glucose 6-dehydrogenase
: (R)-4-hydroxyphenyllactate dehydrogenase
: histidinol dehydrogenase|
: quinate/shikimate dehydrogenase (NAD+)
: shikimate dehydrogenase (NADP+)
: glyoxylate reductase
: L-lactate dehydrogenase
: D-lactate dehydrogenase
: glycerate dehydrogenase
: 3-hydroxybutyrate dehydrogenase
: 3-hydroxyisobutyrate dehydrogenase
: mevaldate reductase
: mevaldate reductase (NADPH)
: hydroxymethylglutaryl-CoA reductase (NADPH)
: 3-hydroxyacyl-CoA dehydrogenase
: acetoacetyl-CoA reductase
: malate dehydrogenase
: malate dehydrogenase (oxaloacetate-decarboxylating)
: malate dehydrogenase (decarboxylating)
: malate dehydrogenase (oxaloacetate-decarboxylating) (NADP+)
: isocitrate dehydrogenase (NAD+)
: isocitrate dehydrogenase (NADP+)
: phosphogluconate 2-dehydrogenase
: phosphogluconate dehydrogenase (NADP+-dependent, decarboxylating)
: L-gulonate 3-dehydrogenase
: L-arabinose 1-dehydrogenase
:  glucose 1-dehydrogenase [NAD(P)+)]
: D-galactose 1-dehydrogenase
: glucose-6-phosphate dehydrogenase (NADP+)
: 3α-hydroxysteroid 3-dehydrogenase (Si-specific)
: 3(or 17)β-hydroxysteroid dehydrogenase
: 3α-hydroxycholanate dehydrogenase (NAD+)
: 3α(or 20β)-hydroxysteroid dehydrogenase
: allyl-alcohol dehydrogenase
: lactaldehyde reductase (NADPH)
: ribitol 2-dehydrogenase
: fructuronate reductase
: tagaturonate reductase
: 3-hydroxypropionate dehydrogenase
: 2-hydroxy-3-oxopropionate reductase
: 4-hydroxybutyrate dehydrogenase
: 17β-estradiol 17-dehydrogenase
EC 1.1.1.63:  testosterone 17β-dehydrogenase. Now EC 1.1.1.239, 3α(17β)-hydroxysteroid dehydrogenase (NAD+)
: testosterone 17β-dehydrogenase (NADP+)
: pyridoxine 4-dehydrogenase
: ω-hydroxydecanoate dehydrogenase
: mannitol 2-dehydrogenase
 EC 1.1.1.68: 5,10-methylenetetrahydrofolate reductase. Now EC 1.5.1.20, methylenetetrahydrofolate reductase [NAD(P)H]
: gluconate 5-dehydrogenase
 EC 1.1.1.70: D-glucuronolactone dehydrogenase. Now included with EC 1.2.1.3 aldehyde dehydrogenase (NAD+)
:  alcohol dehydrogenase [NAD(P)+]
: glycerol dehydrogenase (NADP+)
: octanol dehydrogenase
 EC 1.1.1.74: D-aminopropanol dehydrogenase (reaction due to EC 1.1.1.4 (R,R)-butanediol dehydrogenase)
: (R)-aminopropanol dehydrogenase
: (S,S)-butanediol dehydrogenase
: lactaldehyde reductase
: methylglyoxal reductase (NADH-dependent)
: glyoxylate reductase (NADP+)
: isopropanol dehydrogenase (NADP+)
: hydroxypyruvate reductase
: malate dehydrogenase (NADP+)
: D-malate dehydrogenase (decarboxylating)
: dimethylmalate dehydrogenase
: 3-isopropylmalate dehydrogenase
: ketol-acid reductoisomerase (NADP+)
: homoisocitrate dehydrogenase
: hydroxymethylglutaryl-CoA reductase
 EC 1.1.1.89: dihydroxyisovalerate dehydrogenase (isomerizing). Now included with EC 1.1.1.86 ketol-acid reductoisomerase
: aryl-alcohol dehydrogenase
: aryl-alcohol dehydrogenase (NADP+)
: oxaloglycolate reductase (decarboxylating)
: tartrate dehydrogenase
:  glycerol-3-phosphate dehydrogenase [NAD(P)+]
: phosphoglycerate dehydrogenase
: diiodophenylpyruvate reductase
: 3-hydroxybenzyl-alcohol dehydrogenase
: (R)-2-hydroxy-fatty-acid dehydrogenase
: (S)-2-hydroxy-fatty-acid dehydrogenase
:  3-oxoacyl-[acyl-carrier-protein] reductase
: acylglycerone-phosphate reductase
: 3-dehydrosphinganine reductase
: L-threonine 3-dehydrogenase
: 4-oxoproline reductase
: all-trans-retinol dehydrogenase (NAD+)
: pantoate 4-dehydrogenase
: pyridoxal 4-dehydrogenase
: carnitine 3-dehydrogenase
 EC 1.1.1.109: Now EC 1.3.1.28, 2,3-dihydro-2,3-dihydroxybenzoate dehydrogenase
: aromatic 2-oxoacid reductase
: 3-(imidazol-5-yl)lactate dehydrogenase
: indanol dehydrogenase
: L-xylose 1-dehydrogenase
: apiose 1-reductase
: ribose 1-dehydrogenase (NADP+)
: D-arabinose 1-dehydrogenase (NAD+)
:  D-arabinose 1-dehydrogenase [NAD(P)+]
: glucose 1-dehydrogenase (NAD+)
: glucose 1-dehydrogenase (NADP+)
: galactose 1-dehydrogenase (NADP+)
: aldose 1-dehydrogenase (NAD+)
: D-threo-aldose 1-dehydrogenase
: sorbose 5-dehydrogenase (NADP+)
: fructose 5-dehydrogenase (NADP+)
: 2-deoxy-D-gluconate 3-dehydrogenase
: 2-dehydro-3-deoxy-D-gluconate 6-dehydrogenase
: 2-dehydro-3-deoxy-D-gluconate 5-dehydrogenase
 EC 1.1.1.128: The reaction described is covered by EC 1.1.1.264, L-idonate 5-dehydrogenase.
: L-threonate 3-dehydrogenase
: 3-dehydro-L-gulonate 2-dehydrogenase
: mannuronate reductase
: GDP-mannose 6-dehydrogenase
: dTDP-4-dehydrorhamnose reductase
: dTDP-6-deoxy-L-talose 4-dehydrogenase (NADP+)
: GDP-6-deoxy-D-talose 4-dehydrogenase
: UDP-N-acetylglucosamine 6-dehydrogenase
: ribitol-5-phosphate 2-dehydrogenase
: mannitol 2-dehydrogenase (NADP+)
 EC 1.1.1.139: polyol dehydrogenase (NADP+). Now included with EC 1.1.1.21 aldehyde reductase
: sorbitol-6-phosphate 2-dehydrogenase
: 15-hydroxyprostaglandin dehydrogenase (NAD+)
: D-pinitol dehydrogenase
: sequoyitol dehydrogenase
: perillyl-alcohol dehydrogenase
: 3β-hydroxy-Δ5-steroid dehydrogenase
: 11β-hydroxysteroid dehydrogenase
: 16α-hydroxysteroid dehydrogenase
: estradiol 17α-dehydrogenase
: 20α-hydroxysteroid dehydrogenase
: 21-hydroxysteroid dehydrogenase (NAD+)
: 21-hydroxysteroid dehydrogenase (NADP+)
: 3α-hydroxy-5β-androstane-17-one 3α-dehydrogenase
: sepiapterin reductase (L-erythro-7,8-dihydrobiopterin forming)
: ureidoglycolate dehydrogenase
 EC 1.1.1.155: homoisocitrate dehydrogenase. The enzyme is identical to EC 1.1.1.87, homoisocitrate dehydrogenase
: glycerol 2-dehydrogenase (NADP+)
: 3-hydroxybutyryl-CoA dehydrogenase
 EC 1.1.1.158: Now EC 1.3.1.98, UDP-N-acetylmuramate dehydrogenase
: 7α-hydroxysteroid dehydrogenase
: dihydrobunolol dehydrogenase
 EC 1.1.1.161: The activity is part of EC 1.14.13.15, cholestanetriol 26-monooxygenase
: erythrulose reductase
: cyclopentanol dehydrogenase
: hexadecanol dehydrogenase
: 2-alkyn-1-ol dehydrogenase
: hydroxycyclohexanecarboxylate dehydrogenase
: hydroxymalonate dehydrogenase
: 2-dehydropantolactone reductase (Re-specific)
: 2-dehydropantoate 2-reductase
: 3β-hydroxysteroid-4α-carboxylate 3-dehydrogenase (decarboxylating)
 EC 1.1.1.171: Now EC 1.5.1.20, methylenetetrahydrofolate reductase [NAD(P)H]
: 2-oxoadipate reductase
: L-rhamnose 1-dehydrogenase
: cyclohexane-1,2-diol dehydrogenase
: D-xylose 1-dehydrogenase
: 12α-hydroxysteroid dehydrogenase
: glycerol-3-phosphate 1-dehydrogenase (NADP+)
: 3-hydroxy-2-methylbutyryl-CoA dehydrogenase
: D-xylose 1-dehydrogenase (NADP+, D-xylono-1,5-lactone-forming)
 EC 1.1.1.180: Now included with EC 1.1.1.131 mannuronate reductase
: cholest-5-ene-3β,7α-diol 3β-dehydrogenase
 EC 1.1.1.182: Now included with EC 1.1.1.198 (+)-borneol dehydrogenase, EC 1.1.1.227 (-)-borneol dehydrogenase and EC 1.1.1.228 (+)-sabinol dehydrogenase
: geraniol dehydrogenase (NADP+)
: carbonyl reductase (NADPH)
: L-glycol dehydrogenase
: dTDP-galactose 6-dehydrogenase
: GDP-4-dehydro-D-rhamnose reductase
: prostaglandin-F synthase
: prostaglandin-E2 9-reductase
: indole-3-acetaldehyde reductase (NADH)
: indole-3-acetaldehyde reductase (NADPH)
: long-chain-alcohol dehydrogenase
: 5-amino-6-(5-phosphoribosylamino)uracil reductase
: coniferyl-alcohol dehydrogenase
: cinnamyl-alcohol dehydrogenase
: 15-hydroxyprostaglandin-D dehydrogenase (NADP+)
: 15-hydroxyprostaglandin dehydrogenase (NADP+)
: (+)-borneol dehydrogenase
: (S)-usnate reductase
: aldose-6-phosphate reductase (NADPH)
: (+)-sabinol dehydrogenase

: galactitol-1-phosphate 5-dehydrogenase
: tetrahydroxynaphthalene reductase
 EC 1.1.1.253: Now EC 1.5.1.33, pteridine reductase
: (S)-carnitine 3-dehydrogenase
: mannitol dehydrogenase
: fluoren-9-ol dehydrogenase
: 4-(hydroxymethyl)benzenesulfonate dehydrogenase
: 6-hydroxyhexanoate dehydrogenase
: 3-hydroxypimeloyl-CoA dehydrogenase
: sulcatone reductase
: sn-glycerol-1-phosphate dehydrogenase
: 4-hydroxythreonine-4-phosphate dehydrogenase
: 1,5-anhydro-D-fructose reductase
: L-idonate 5-dehydrogenase
: 3-methylbutanal reductase
: dTDP-4-dehydro-6-deoxyglucose reductase
: 1-deoxy-D-xylulose-5-phosphate reductoisomerase
: 2-(R)-hydroxypropyl-CoM dehydrogenase
: 2-(S)-hydroxypropyl-CoM dehydrogenase
: 3β-hydroxysteroid 3-dehydrogenase
: GDP-L-fucose synthase
: D-2-hydroxyacid dehydrogenase (NADP+)
: vellosimine dehydrogenase
: 2,5-didehydrogluconate reductase (2-dehydro-D-gluconate-forming)
: (+)-trans-carveol dehydrogenase
: serine 3-dehydrogenase (NADP+)
: 3β-hydroxy-5β-steroid dehydrogenase
: 3β-hydroxy-5α-steroid dehydrogenase
: (R)-3-hydroxyacid-ester dehydrogenase
: (S)-3-hydroxyacid-ester dehydrogenase
: GDP-4-dehydro-6-deoxy-D-mannose reductase
:  quinate/shikimate dehydrogenase [NAD(P)+)]
: methylglyoxal reductase (NADPH-dependent)
: S-(hydroxymethyl)glutathione dehydrogenase
: 3′′-deamino-3′′-oxonicotianamine reductase
: isocitrate—homoisocitrate dehydrogenase
: D-arabinitol dehydrogenase (NADP+)
: xanthoxin dehydrogenase
: sorbose reductase
: 4-phosphoerythronate dehydrogenase
: 2-hydroxymethylglutarate dehydrogenase
: 1,5-anhydro-D-fructose reductase (1,5-anhydro-D-mannitol-forming)
 EC 1.1.1.293: tropinone reductase I. This enzyme was already in the Enzyme List as EC 1.1.1.206, tropine dehydrogenase so EC 1.1.1.293 has been withdrawn at the public-review stage
: chlorophyll(ide) b reductase
: momilactone-A synthase
: dihydrocarveol dehydrogenase
: limonene-1,2-diol dehydrogenase
: 3-hydroxypropionate dehydrogenase (NADP+)
:  malate dehydrogenase [NAD(P)+)]
: NADP-retinol dehydrogenase
: D-arabitol-phosphate dehydrogenase
: 2,5-diamino-6-(ribosylamino)-4(3H)-pyrimidinone 5′-phosphate reductase
:  diacetyl reductase [(R)-acetoin forming]
:  diacetyl reductase [(S)-acetoin forming]
: UDP-glucuronic acid dehydrogenase (UDP-4-keto-hexauronic acid decarboxylating)
: S-(hydroxymethyl)mycothiol dehydrogenase
: D-xylose reductase
: sulfopropanediol 3-dehydrogenase
: phosphonoacetaldehyde reductase (NADH)
: (S)-sulfolactate dehydrogenase
: (S)-1-phenylethanol dehydrogenase
: 2-hydroxy-4-carboxymuconate semialdehyde hemiacetal dehydrogenase
: sulfoacetaldehyde reductase
 EC 1.1.1.314: Now known to be catalyzed by EC 1.14.14.95, germacrene A hydroxylase
: 11-cis-retinol dehydrogenase
: L-galactose 1-dehydrogenase
: perakine reductase
: eugenol synthase
: isoeugenol synthase
:  benzil reductase [(S)-benzoin forming]
:  benzil reductase [(R)-benzoin forming]
: (–)-endo-fenchol dehydrogenase
: (+)-thujan-3-ol dehydrogenase
: 8-hydroxygeraniol dehydrogenase
: sepiapterin reductase (L-threo-7,8-dihydrobiopterin forming)
: zerumbone synthase
: 5-exo-hydroxycamphor dehydrogenase
: nicotine blue oxidoreductase
: 2-deoxy-scyllo-inosamine dehydrogenase
: very-long-chain 3-oxoacyl-CoA reductase
: secoisolariciresinol dehydrogenase
: chanoclavine-I dehydrogenase
: decaprenylphospho-β-D-erythro-pentofuranosid-2-ulose 2-reductase
: methylecgonone reductase
: UDP-N-acetyl-2-amino-2-deoxyglucuronate dehydrogenase
: UDP-N-acetyl-D-mannosamine dehydrogenase
: L-2-hydroxycarboxylate dehydrogenase (NAD+)
: (2R)-3-sulfolactate dehydrogenase (NADP+)
: dTDP-6-deoxy-L-talose 4-dehydrogenase (NAD+)
: 1-deoxy-11β-hydroxypentalenate dehydrogenase
: CDP-abequose synthase
: CDP-paratose synthase

 At present (October 2021) most of the entries from 343 onwards have no Wikipedia articles

 EC 1.1.1.343: phosphogluconate dehydrogenase (NAD+-dependent, decarboxylating)
 EC 1.1.1.344: dTDP-6-deoxy-L-talose 4-dehydrogenase [NAD(P)+]
 EC 1.1.1.345: D-2-hydroxyacid dehydrogenase (NAD+)
 EC 1.1.1.346: 2,5-didehydrogluconate reductase (2-dehydro-L-gulonate-forming)
 EC 1.1.1.347: geraniol dehydrogenase (NAD+)
 EC 1.1.1.348: (3R)-2′-hydroxyisoflavanone reductase
 EC 1.1.1.349: norsolorinic acid ketoreductase
 EC 1.1.1.350: ureidoglycolate dehydrogenase (NAD+)
 EC 1.1.1.351: phosphogluconate dehydrogenase [NAD(P)+-dependent, decarboxylating]
 EC 1.1.1.352: 5′-hydroxyaverantin dehydrogenase
 EC 1.1.1.353: versiconal hemiacetal acetate reductase
 EC 1.1.1.354: farnesol dehydrogenase (NAD+)
 EC 1.1.1.355: 2′-dehydrokanamycin reductase
 EC 1.1.1.356: GDP-L-colitose synthase
 EC 1.1.1.357: 3α-hydroxysteroid 3-dehydrogenase
 EC 1.1.1.358: 2-dehydropantolactone reductase
 EC 1.1.1.359: aldose 1-dehydrogenase [NAD(P)+]
 EC 1.1.1.360: glucose/galactose 1-dehydrogenase
 EC 1.1.1.361: glucose-6-phosphate 3-dehydrogenase
 EC 1.1.1.362: aklaviketone reductase
 EC 1.1.1.363: glucose-6-phosphate dehydrogenase [NAD(P)+]
 EC 1.1.1.364: dTDP-4-dehydro-6-deoxy-α-D-gulose 4-ketoreductase
 EC 1.1.1.365: D-galacturonate reductase
 EC 1.1.1.366: L-idonate 5-dehydrogenase (NAD+)
 EC 1.1.1.367: UDP-2-acetamido-2,6-β-L-arabino-hexul-4-ose reductase
 EC 1.1.1.368: 6-hydroxycyclohex-1-ene-1-carbonyl-CoA dehydrogenase
 EC 1.1.1.369: D-chiro-inositol 1-dehydrogenase
 EC 1.1.1.370: scyllo-inositol 2-dehydrogenase (NAD+)
 EC 1.1.1.371: scyllo-inositol 2-dehydrogenase (NADP+)
 EC 1.1.1.372: D/L-glyceraldehyde reductase
 EC 1.1.1.373: sulfolactaldehyde 3-reductase
 EC 1.1.1.374: UDP-N-acetylglucosamine 3-dehydrogenase
 EC 1.1.1.375: L-2-hydroxycarboxylate dehydrogenase [NAD(P)+]
 EC 1.1.1.376: L-arabinose 1-dehydrogenase [NAD(P)+]
 EC 1.1.1.377: L-rhamnose 1-dehydrogenase (NADP+)
 EC 1.1.1.378: L-rhamnose 1-dehydrogenase [NAD(P)+]
 EC 1.1.1.379: (R)-mandelate dehydrogenase
 EC 1.1.1.380: L-gulonate 5-dehydrogenase
 EC 1.1.1.381: 3-hydroxy acid dehydrogenase
 EC 1.1.1.382: ketol-acid reductoisomerase (NAD+)
 EC 1.1.1.383: ketol-acid reductoisomerase [NAD(P)+]
 EC 1.1.1.384: dTDP-3,4-didehydro-2,6-dideoxy-α-D-glucose 3-reductase
 EC 1.1.1.385: dihydroanticapsin dehydrogenase
 EC 1.1.1.386: ipsdienol dehydrogenase
 EC 1.1.1.387: L-serine 3-dehydrogenase (NAD+)
 EC 1.1.1.388: glucose-6-phosphate dehydrogenase (NAD+)
 EC 1.1.1.389: 2-dehydro-3-deoxy-L-galactonate 5-dehydrogenase
 EC 1.1.1.390: sulfoquinovose 1-dehydrogenase
 EC 1.1.1.391: 3β-hydroxycholanate 3-dehydrogenase (NAD+)
 EC 1.1.1.392: 3α-hydroxycholanate dehydrogenase (NADP+)
 EC 1.1.1.393: 3β-hydroxycholanate 3-dehydrogenase (NADP+)
 EC 1.1.1.394: aurachin B dehydrogenase
 EC 1.1.1.395: 3α-hydroxy bile acid-CoA-ester 3-dehydrogenase
 EC 1.1.1.396: bacteriochlorophyllide a dehydrogenase
 EC 1.1.1.397: β-methylindole-3-pyruvate reductase
 EC 1.1.1.398: 2-glutathionyl-2-methylbut-3-en-1-ol dehydrogenase
 EC 1.1.1.399: 2-oxoglutarate reductase
 EC 1.1.1.400: 2-methyl-1,2-propanediol dehydrogenase
 EC 1.1.1.401: 2-dehydro-3-deoxy-L-rhamnonate dehydrogenase (NAD+)
 EC 1.1.1.402: D-erythritol 1-phosphate dehydrogenase
 EC 1.1.1.403: D-threitol dehydrogenase (NAD+)
 EC 1.1.1.404: tetrachlorobenzoquinone reductase
 EC 1.1.1.405: ribitol-5-phosphate 2-dehydrogenase (NADP+)
 EC 1.1.1.406: galactitol 2-dehydrogenase (L-tagatose-forming)
 EC 1.1.1.407: D-altritol 5-dehydrogenase
 EC 1.1.1.408: 4-phospho-D-threonate 3-dehydrogenase
 EC 1.1.1.409: 4-phospho-D-erythronate 3-dehydrogenase
 EC 1.1.1.410: D-erythronate 2-dehydrogenase
 EC 1.1.1.411: L-threonate 2-dehydrogenase
 EC 1.1.1.412: 2-alkyl-3-oxoalkanoate reductase
 EC 1.1.1.413: A-factor type γ-butyrolactone 1′-reductase (1S-forming)
 EC 1.1.1.414: L-galactonate 5-dehydrogenase
 EC 1.1.1.415: noscapine synthase
 EC 1.1.1.416: isopyridoxal dehydrogenase (5-pyridoxolactone-forming)
 EC 1.1.1.417: 3β-hydroxysteroid-4β-carboxylate 3-dehydrogenase (decarboxylating)
 EC 1.1.1.418: plant 3β-hydroxysteroid-4α-carboxylate 3-dehydrogenase (decarboxylating)
 EC 1.1.1.419: nepetalactol dehydrogenase
 EC 1.1.1.420: D-apiose dehydrogenase
 EC 1.1.1.421: D-apionate oxidoisomerase
 EC 1.1.1.422: pseudoephedrine dehydrogenase
 EC 1.1.1.423: (1R,2S)-ephedrine 1-dehydrogenase
 EC 1.1.1.424: D-xylose 1-dehydrogenase (NADP+, D-xylono-1,4-lactone-forming)
 EC 1.1.1.425: levoglucosan dehydrogenase
 EC 1.1.1.426: UDP-N-acetyl-α-D-quinovosamine dehydrogenase

EC 1.1.2 With a cytochrome as acceptor

EC 1.1.2.1: glycerolphosphate dehydrogenase. As the acceptor is now known, the enzyme has been transferred to EC 1.1.5.3, glycerol-3-phosphate dehydrogenase.	 
: mannitol dehydrogenase (cytochrome)	 
: L-lactate dehydrogenase (cytochrome)	 
: D-lactate dehydrogenase (cytochrome)	 
: D-lactate dehydrogenase (cytochrome c-553)	 
: polyvinyl alcohol dehydrogenase (cytochrome)	 
: methanol dehydrogenase (cytochrome c)	 
: alcohol dehydrogenase (cytochrome c)	 
EC 1.1.2.9: 1-butanol dehydrogenase (cytochrome c) * 
EC 1.1.2.10: lanthanide-dependent methanol dehydrogenase *

 *No Wikipedia article

EC 1.1.3 With oxygen as acceptor
 EC 1.1.3.1:  Now included with EC 1.1.3.15 (S)-2-hydroxy-acid oxidase
 : L-lactate oxidase *
 : malate oxidase
 : glucose oxidase
 : hexose oxidase
 : cholesterol oxidase
 : aryl-alcohol oxidase
 : L-gulonolactone oxidase
 : galactose oxidase
 : pyranose oxidase
 : L-sorbose oxidase
 : pyridoxine 4-oxidase
 : alcohol oxidase
 : catechol oxidase (dimerizing)
 : (S)-2-hydroxy-acid oxidase
 : ecdysone oxidase
 : choline oxidase
 : Secondary-alcohol oxidase
 : 4-hydroxymandelate oxidase
 : long-chain-alcohol oxidase
 : glycerol-3-phosphate oxidase
 EC 1.1.3.22: Now EC 1.17.3.2, xanthine oxidase. The enzyme was incorrectly classified as acting on a CH-OH group
 : Thiamine oxidase
 : L-galactonolactone oxidase
 EC 1.1.3.25: Now included with EC 1.1.99.18, cellobiose dehydrogenase (acceptor)
 EC 1.1.3.26: Now EC 1.21.3.2, columbamine oxidase
 : hydroxyphytanate oxidase
 : nucleoside oxidase
 : N-acylhexosamine oxidase
 : polyvinyl-alcohol oxidase
 EC 1.1.3.31: deleted, cannot be distinguished from EC 1.1.3.13, alcohol oxidase
 EC 1.1.3.32: Now EC 1.14.21.1, (S)-stylopine synthase
 EC 1.1.3.33: Now EC 1.14.21.2, (S)-cheilanthifoline synthase
 EC 1.1.3.34: Now EC 1.14.21.3, berbamunine synthase
 EC 1.1.3.35: Now EC 1.14.21.4, salutaridine synthase
 EC 1.1.3.36: Now EC 1.14.21.5, (S)-canadine synthase
 : D-arabinono-1,4-lactone oxidase
 : vanillyl-alcohol oxidase
 : nucleoside oxidase (H2O2-forming)
 : D-mannitol oxidase
 : xylitol oxidase
 : prosolanapyrone-II oxidase
 : paromamine 6′-oxidase
 : [[6'-Hydroxyneomycin C oxidase|6′′′-hydroxyneomycin C oxidase]]
 EC 1.1.3.45: aclacinomycin-N oxidase *
 EC 1.1.3.46: 4-hydroxymandelate oxidase *	 
 EC 1.1.3.47: 5-(hydroxymethyl)furfural oxidase *	 
 EC 1.1.3.48: 3-deoxy-α-D-manno-octulosonate 8-oxidase *
 EC 1.1.3.49: (R)-mandelonitrile oxidase *

 *No Wikipedia article

EC 1.1.4 With a disulfide as acceptor
 EC 1.1.4.1: Now EC 1.17.4.4, vitamin-K-epoxide reductase (warfarin-sensitive)
 EC 1.1.4.2: Now EC 1.17.4.5, vitamin-K-epoxide reductase (warfarin-insensitive)

EC 1.1.5 With a quinone or similar compound as acceptor
 EC 1.1.5.1: deleted, see EC 1.1.99.18 cellobiose dehydrogenase (acceptor)
 : quinoprotein glucose dehydrogenase
 : glycerol-3-phosphate dehydrogenase (quinone)
 : malate dehydrogenase (quinone)
 : alcohol dehydrogenase (quinone)
 : formate dehydrogenase-N
 : cyclic alcohol dehydrogenase (quinone)
 : quinate dehydrogenase (quinone)

 EC 1.1.9 With a copper protein as acceptor 
 : alcohol dehydrogenase (azurin)

 EC 1.1.98 With other, known, acceptors 
 EC 1.1.98.1: Now EC 1.1.9.1, alcohol dehydrogenase (azurin)
 : glucose-6-phosphate dehydrogenase (coenzyme-F420)
 : decaprenylphospho-β-D-ribofuranose 2-oxidase
 EC 1.1.98.3: decaprenylphospho-β-D-ribofuranose 2-dehydrogenase * 
 EC 1.1.98.4: F420H2:quinone oxidoreductase *
 EC 1.1.98.5: secondary-alcohol dehydrogenase (coenzyme-F420) * 
 EC 1.1.98.6: ribonucleoside-triphosphate reductase (formate) *	 
 EC 1.1.98.7: serine-type anaerobic sulfatase-maturating enzyme *

 *No Wikipedia article

EC 1.1.99 With unknown physiological acceptors
 : choline dehydrogenase
 : L-2-hydroxyglutarate dehydrogenase
 : gluconate 2-dehydrogenase (acceptor)
 : dehydrogluconate dehydrogenase
 EC 1.1.99.5: now EC 1.1.5.3, glycerol-3-phosphate dehydrogenase
 : D-2-hydroxy-acid dehydrogenase
 : lactate—malate transhydrogenase
 EC 1.1.99.8: Now EC 1.1.2.7, methanol dehydrogenase (cytochrome c) and EC 1.1.2.8, alcohol dehydrogenase (cytochrome c).
 : pyridoxine 5-dehydrogenase
 EC 1.1.99.10: Now EC 1.1.5.9, glucose 1-dehydrogenase (FAD, quinone)
 EC 1.1.99.11: Now classified as EC 1.1.5.14, fructose 5-dehydrogenase
 : sorbose dehydrogenase
 : glucoside 3-dehydrogenase
 : glycolate dehydrogenase
 EC 1.1.99.15: Now EC 1.5.1.20, methylenetetrahydrofolate reductase [NAD(P)H]
 EC 1.1.99.16: Now EC EC 1.1.5.4, malate dehydrogenase (quinone)
 EC 1.1.99.17: Now EC 1.1.5.2, quinoprotein glucose dehydrogenase
 : cellobiose dehydrogenase (acceptor)
 EC 1.1.99.19: Now EC 1.17.99.4, uracil/thymine dehydrogenase
 : alkan-1-ol dehydrogenase (acceptor)
 : D-sorbitol dehydrogenase (acceptor)
 : glycerol dehydrogenase (acceptor)
 EC 1.1.99.23: Now EC 1.1.2.6, polyvinyl alcohol dehydrogenase (cytochrome)
 : hydroxyacid-oxoacid transhydrogenase
 EC 1.1.99.25: Now EC 1.1.5.8, quinate dehydrogenase (quinone),
 : 3-hydroxycyclohexanone dehydrogenase
 : (R)-pantolactone dehydrogenase (flavin)
 : glucose-fructose oxidoreductase
 : pyranose dehydrogenase (acceptor)
 : 2-oxoacid reductase
 : (S)-mandelate dehydrogenase
 : L-sorbose 1-dehydrogenase
 EC 1.1.99.33: Now EC 1.17.99.7, formate dehydrogenase (acceptor)
 EC 1.1.99.34: now EC 1.1.98.2, glucose-6-phosphate dehydrogenase (coenzyme-F420)
 : soluble quinoprotein glucose dehydrogenase
 : alcohol dehydrogenase (nicotinoprotein)
 : methanol dehydrogenase (nicotinoprotein)
 : 2-deoxy-scyllo-inosamine dehydrogenase (AdoMet-dependent)
 : D-2-hydroxyglutarate dehydrogenase
 EC 1.1.99.40: (R)-2-hydroxyglutarate—pyruvate transhydrogenase * 
 EC 1.1.99.41: 3-hydroxy-1,2-didehydro-2,3-dihydrotabersonine reductase *	 
 EC 1.1.99.42: 4-pyridoxic acid dehydrogenase *
 *No Wikipedia article

EC 1.2 Acting on the aldehyde or oxo group of donors
EC 1.2.1 With NAD+ or NADP+ as acceptor
 EC 1.2.1.1: deleted, replaced by EC 1.1.1.284, S-(hydroxymethyl)glutathione dehydrogenase and EC 4.4.1.22, S-(hydroxymethyl)glutathione synthase
 EC 1.2.1.2: Now EC 1.17.1.9, formate dehydrogenase
 : aldehyde dehydrogenase (NAD+)
 : aldehyde dehydrogenase (NADP+)
 : aldehyde dehydrogenase (NAD(P)+)
 EC 1.2.1.6: deleted (was benzaldehyde dehydrogenase)
 : benzaldehyde dehydrogenase (NADP+)
 : betaine-aldehyde dehydrogenase
 : glyceraldehyde-3-phosphate dehydrogenase (NADP+)
 : acetaldehyde dehydrogenase (acetylating)
 : aspartate-semialdehyde dehydrogenase
 : glyceraldehyde-3-phosphate dehydrogenase (phosphorylating)
 : glyceraldehyde-3-phosphate dehydrogenase (NADP+) (phosphorylating)
 EC 1.2.1.14: Now EC 1.1.1.205, IMP dehydrogenase
 : malonate-semialdehyde dehydrogenase
 :  succinate-semialdehyde dehydrogenase [NAD(P)+]
 : glyoxylate dehydrogenase (acylating)
 : malonate-semialdehyde dehydrogenase (acetylating)
 : aminobutyraldehyde dehydrogenase
 : glutarate-semialdehyde dehydrogenase
 : glycolaldehyde dehydrogenase
 : lactaldehyde dehydrogenase
 : 2-oxoaldehyde dehydrogenase (NAD+)
 : succinate-semialdehyde dehydrogenase (NAD+)
 : branched-chain α-keto acid dehydrogenase system
 : 2,5-dioxovalerate dehydrogenase
 : methylmalonate-semialdehyde dehydrogenase (CoA-acylating)
 : benzaldehyde dehydrogenase (NAD+)
 : aryl-aldehyde dehydrogenase
 :  carboxylate reductase (NADP+)
 : L-aminoadipate-semialdehyde dehydrogenase
 : aminomuconate-semialdehyde dehydrogenase
 : (R)-dehydropantoate dehydrogenase
 EC 1.2.1.34: Now EC 1.1.1.131, mannuronate reductase
 EC 1.2.1.35: Now EC 1.1.1.203, uronate dehydrogenase
 : retinal dehydrogenase
 EC 1.2.1.37: Now EC 1.17.1.4, xanthine dehydrogenase
 : N-acetyl-γ-glutamyl-phosphate reductase
 : phenylacetaldehyde dehydrogenase
 EC 1.2.1.40: part of EC 1.14.13.15, cholestanetriol 26-monooxygenase
 : glutamate-5-semialdehyde dehydrogenase
 : hexadecanal dehydrogenase (acylating)
 EC 1.2.1.43: Now EC 1.17.1.10, formate dehydrogenase (NADP+)
 : cinnamoyl-CoA reductase
 EC 1.2.1.45: Now EC 1.1.1.312, 2-hydroxy-4-carboxymuconate semialdehyde hemiacetal dehydrogenase
 : formaldehyde dehydrogenase
 : 4-trimethylammoniobutyraldehyde dehydrogenase
 : long-chain-aldehyde dehydrogenase
 : 2-oxoaldehyde dehydrogenase (NADP+)
 : long-chain-fatty-acyl-CoA reductase
 : pyruvate dehydrogenase (NADP+)
 : oxoglutarate dehydrogenase (NADP+)
 : 4-hydroxyphenylacetaldehyde dehydrogenase
 : γ-guanidinobutyraldehyde dehydrogenase
 EC 1.2.1.55: Now EC 1.1.1.279, (R)-3-hydroxyacid-ester dehydrogenase
 EC 1.2.1.56: Now EC 1.1.1.280, (S)-3-hydroxyacid-ester dehydrogenase
 : butanal dehydrogenase
 : phenylglyoxylate dehydrogenase (acylating)
 : glyceraldehyde-3-phosphate dehydrogenase (NAD(P)+)
 : 5-carboxymethyl-2-hydroxymuconic-semialdehyde dehydrogenase
 : 4-hydroxymuconic-semialdehyde dehydrogenase
 : 4-formylbenzenesulfonate dehydrogenase
 : 6-oxohexanoate dehydrogenase
 : 4-hydroxybenzaldehyde dehydrogenase (NAD+)
 : salicylaldehyde dehydrogenase
 EC 1.2.1.66: Now EC 1.1.1.306, S-(hydroxymethyl)mycothiol dehydrogenase]]
 : vanillin dehydrogenase
 : coniferyl-aldehyde dehydrogenase
 : fluoroacetaldehyde dehydrogenase
 : glutamyl-tRNA reductase
 : succinylglutamate-semialdehyde dehydrogenase
 : erythrose-4-phosphate dehydrogenase
 : sulfoacetaldehyde dehydrogenase
 : abieta-7,13-dien-18-al dehydrogenase
 : malonyl CoA reductase (malonate semialdehyde-forming)
 : succinate-semialdehyde dehydrogenase (acylating)
 : 3,4-dehydroadipyl-CoA semialdehyde dehydrogenase (NADP+)
 : 2-formylbenzoate dehydrogenase
 : succinate-semialdehyde dehydrogenase (NADP+)
 : long-chain acyl-[acyl-carrier-protein] reductase
 : sulfoacetaldehyde dehydrogenase (acylating)
 : β-apo-4′-carotenal oxygenase
 : 3-succinoylsemialdehyde-pyridine dehydrogenase
 : alcohol-forming fatty acyl-CoA reductase
 : 2-hydroxymuconate-6-semialdehyde dehydrogenase
 : geranial dehydrogenase
 EC 1.2.1.87: propanal dehydrogenase (CoA-propanoylating) *
 EC 1.2.1.88: L-glutamate γ-semialdehyde dehydrogenase *
 EC 1.2.1.89: D-glyceraldehyde dehydrogenase (NADP+) *
 EC 1.2.1.90: glyceraldehyde-3-phosphate dehydrogenase [NAD(P)+] *
 EC 1.2.1.91: 3-oxo-5,6-dehydrosuberyl-CoA semialdehyde dehydrogenase *
 EC 1.2.1.92: 3,6-anhydro-α-L-galactose dehydrogenase *
 EC 1.2.1.93: formate dehydrogenase (NAD+, ferredoxin). Now EC 1.17.1.11, formate dehydrogenase (NAD+, ferredoxin) *
 EC 1.2.1.94: farnesal dehydrogenase *
 EC 1.2.1.95: L-2-aminoadipate reductase *
 EC 1.2.1.96: 4-hydroxybenzaldehyde dehydrogenase (++) *
 EC 1.2.1.97: 3-sulfolactaldehyde dehydrogenase *
 EC 1.2.1.98: 2-hydroxy-2-methylpropanal dehydrogenase *
 EC 1.2.1.99: 4-(γ-glutamylamino)butanal dehydrogenase *
 EC 1.2.1.100: 5-formyl-3-hydroxy-2-methylpyridine 4-carboxylic acid 5-dehydrogenase *
 EC 1.2.1.101: L-tyrosine reductase *
 EC 1.2.1.102: isopyridoxal dehydrogenase (5-pyridoxate-forming) *
 EC 1.2.1.103: [amino-group carrier protein]-6-phospho-L-2-aminoadipate reductase *
 EC 1.2.1.104: pyruvate dehydrogenase system *
 EC 1.2.1.105: 2-oxoglutarate dehydrogenase system *
 EC 1.2.1.106: [amino-group carrier protein]-5-phospho-L-glutamate reductase *
 EC 1.2.1.107: glyceraldehyde-3-phosphate dehydrogenase (arsenate-transferring) *
 * No Wikipedia article

EC 1.2.2 With a cytochrome as acceptor
 : formate dehydrogenase (cytochrome)
 EC 1.2.2.2: Now covered by EC 1.2.5.1, pyruvate dehydrogenase (quinone)
 EC 1.2.2.3: Now EC 1.17.2.3, formate dehydrogenase (cytochrome-c-553)
 EC 1.2.2.4: Now classified as EC 1.2.5.3, aerobic carbon monoxide dehydrogenase

EC 1.2.3 With oxygen as acceptor
 : aldehyde oxidase
 EC 1.2.3.2: Now EC 1.17.3.2, xanthine oxidase
 : pyruvate oxidase
 : oxalate oxidase
 : glyoxylate oxidase
 : pyruvate oxidase (CoA-acetylating)
 : indole-3-acetaldehyde oxidase
 : pyridoxal oxidase
 : aryl-aldehyde oxidase
 EC 1.2.3.10: deleted, activity due to EC 1.2.2.4 carbon-monoxide dehydrogenase (cytochrome b-561)
 EC 1.2.3.11: retinal oxidase
 EC 1.2.3.12: Now included with EC 1.2.3.1, aldehyde oxidase
 EC 1.2.3.13: Now EC 1.14.13.82, vanillate monooxygenase
 : Abscisic-aldehyde oxidase
 EC 1.2.3.15: (methyl)glyoxal oxidase *
 * No Wikipedia article

EC 1.2.4 With a disulfide as acceptor
 : pyruvate dehydrogenase (acetyl-transferring)
 : oxoglutarate dehydrogenase (succinyl-transferring)
 EC 1.2.4.3:  Now included with EC 1.2.4.4, 3-methyl-2-oxobutanoate dehydrogenase (2-methylpropanoyl-transferring)
 : 3-methyl-2-oxobutanoate dehydrogenase (2-methylpropanoyl-transferring)

EC 1.2.5 With a quinone or similar compound as acceptor
 : pyruvate dehydrogenase (quinone)
 EC 1.2.5.2: aldehyde dehydrogenase (quinone) * 
 EC 1.2.5.3: aerobic carbon monoxide dehydrogenase	*
 *No Wikipedia article

EC 1.2.7 With an iron–sulfur protein as acceptor
 : pyruvate synthase
 EC 1.2.7.2: Now included with EC 1.2.7.1, pyruvate synthase.
 : 2-oxoglutarate synthase
 : anaerobic carbon monoxide dehydrogenase
 : aldehyde ferredoxin oxidoreductase
 : glyceraldehyde-3-phosphate dehydrogenase (ferredoxin)
 : 3-methyl-2-oxobutanoate dehydrogenase (ferredoxin)
 : indolepyruvate ferredoxin oxidoreductase
 EC 1.2.7.9: deleted, identical to EC 1.2.7.3, 2-oxoglutarate synthase
 : oxalate oxidoreductase
 EC 1.2.7.11: 2-oxoacid oxidoreductase (ferredoxin) *	 
 EC 1.2.7.12: formylmethanofuran dehydrogenase	*
 *No Wikipedia article

EC 1.2.99: With unknown physiological acceptors
 EC 1.2.99.1:  Now EC 1.17.99.4, uracil/thymine dehydrogenase	
 EC 1.2.99.2: Now EC 1.2.7.4, carbon-monoxide dehydrogenase (ferredoxin)
 EC 1.2.99.3: Now EC 1.2.5.2, aldehyde dehydrogenase (quinone)
 EC 1.2.99.4: Now EC 1.2.98.1, formaldehyde dismutase
 EC 1.2.99.5: Now EC 1.2.7.12, formylmethanofuran dehydrogenase
 : carboxylate reductase
 : aldehyde dehydrogenase (FAD-independent)
 EC 1.2.99.8: glyceraldehyde dehydrogenase (FAD-containing) *	 
 EC 1.2.99.9: Now EC 1.17.98.3, formate dehydrogenase (coenzyme F420)	 
 EC 1.2.99.10: 4,4′-diapolycopenoate synthase *
 *No Wikipedia article

EC 1.3 Acting on the CH-CH group of donors
EC 1.3.1 With NAD+  or NADP+ as acceptor
 : dihydrouracil dehydrogenase (NAD+)
 : dihydropyrimidine dehydrogenase (NADP+)
 : Δ4-3-oxosteroid 5β-reductase
 EC 1.3.1.4:  transferred to EC 1.3.1.22, 3-oxo-5α-steroid 4-dehydrogenase (NADP+)
 : cucurbitacin Δ23-reductase
 : fumarate reductase (NADH)
 : meso-tartrate dehydrogenase
 : acyl-CoA dehydrogenase (NADP+)
 : enoyl-[acyl-carrier-protein] reductase (NADH)
 : enoyl-[acyl-carrier-protein] reductase (NADPH, Si-specific)
 : 2-coumarate reductase
 : prephenate dehydrogenase
 : prephenate dehydrogenase (NADP+)
 : dihydroorotate dehydrogenase (NAD+)
 : dihydroorotate dehydrogenase (NADP+)
 : β-nitroacrylate reductase
 : 3-methyleneoxindole reductase
 : kynurenate-7,8-dihydrodiol dehydrogenase
 : cis-1,2-dihydrobenzene-1,2-diol dehydrogenase
 : trans-1,2-dihydrobenzene-1,2-diol dehydrogenase
 : 7-dehydrocholesterol reductase
 : 3-oxo-5α-steroid 4-dehydrogenase (NADP+)
 EC 1.3.1.23: identical to EC 1.3.1.3, Δ4-3-oxosteroid 5β-reductase
 : biliverdin reductase
 : 1,6-dihydroxycyclohexa-2,4-diene-1-carboxylate dehydrogenase
 EC 1.3.1.26: Now EC 1.17.1.8, 4-hydroxy-tetrahydrodipicolinate reductase
 : 2-hexadecenal reductase
 : 2,3-dihydro-2,3-dihydroxybenzoate dehydrogenase
 : cis-1,2-dihydro-1,2-dihydroxynaphthalene dehydrogenase
 EC 1.3.1.30: transferred to EC 1.3.1.22, 3-oxo-5α-steroid 4-dehydrogenase (NADP+)
 : 2-enoate reductase
 : maleylacetate reductase
 : protochlorophyllide reductase
 : 2,4-dienoyl-CoA reductase (NADPH)|2,4-dienoyl-CoA reductase [(2E)-enoyl-CoA-producing]
 EC 1.3.1.35: Now EC 1.14.19.22, microsomal oleoyl-lipid 12-desaturase
 : geissoschizine dehydrogenase
 : cis-2-enoyl-CoA reductase (NADPH)
 : trans-2-enoyl-CoA reductase (NADPH)
 : trans-2-enoyl-CoA reductase (NADPH)
 : 2-hydroxy-6-oxo-6-phenylhexa-2,4-dienoate reductase
 : xanthommatin reductase
 : 12-oxophytodienoate reductase
 : arogenate dehydrogenase
 : trans-2-enoyl-CoA reductase (NAD+)
 : 2′-hydroxyisoflavone reductase
 : biochanin-A reductase
 : α-santonin 1,2-reductase
 : 13,14-dehydro-15-oxoprostaglandin 13-reductase
 : cis-3,4-dihydrophenanthrene-3,4-diol dehydrogenase
 EC 1.3.1.50: n Now EC 1.1.1.252 tetrahydroxynaphthalene reductase
 : 2′-hydroxydaidzein reductase
 EC 1.3.1.52:  Now EC 1.3.8.5, 2-methyl-branched-chain-enoyl-CoA reductase
 : (3S,4R)-3,4-dihydroxycyclohexa-1,5-diene-1,4-dicarboxylate dehydrogenase
 : precorrin-6A reductase
 EC 1.3.1.55: identical to EC 1.3.1.25, 1,6-dihydroxycyclohexa-2,4-diene-1-carboxylate dehydrogenase
 : cis-2,3-dihydrobiphenyl-2,3-diol dehydrogenase
 : phloroglucinol reductase
 : 2,3-dihydroxy-2,3-dihydro-p-cumate dehydrogenase
 EC 1.3.1.59: There is no evidence that the enzyme exists
 : dibenzothiophene dihydrodiol dehydrogenase
 EC 1.3.1.61:  identical to EC 1.3.1.53, (3S,4R)-3,4-dihydroxycyclohexa-1,5-diene-1,4-dicarboxylate dehydrogenase
 : pimeloyl-CoA dehydrogenase
 EC 1.3.1.63: Now EC 1.21.1.2, 2,4-dichlorobenzoyl-CoA reductase
 : phthalate 4,5-cis-dihydrodiol dehydrogenase
 : 5,6-dihydroxy-3-methyl-2-oxo-1,2,5,6-tetrahydroquinoline dehydrogenase
 : cis-dihydroethylcatechol dehydrogenase
 : cis-1,2-dihydroxy-4-methylcyclohexa-3,5-diene-1-carboxylate dehydrogenase
 : 1,2-dihydroxy-6-methylcyclohexa-3,5-dienecarboxylate dehydrogenase
 : zeatin reductase
 : Δ14-sterol reductase
 : Δ24(241)-sterol reductase
 : Δ24-sterol reductase
 : 1,2-dihydrovomilenine reductase
 : 2-alkenal reductase [NAD(P)+]
 : 3,8-divinyl protochlorophyllide a 8-vinyl-reductase (NADPH)
 : precorrin-2 dehydrogenase
 :  anthocyanidin reductase [(2R,3R)-flavan-3-ol-forming]
 : arogenate dehydrogenase (NADP+)
 : arogenate dehydrogenase (NAD(P)+)
 EC 1.3.1.80: Now classified as EC 1.3.7.12, red chlorophyll catabolite reductase
 : (+)-pulegone reductase
 : (-)-isopiperitenone reductase
 : geranylgeranyl diphosphate reductase
 : acrylyl-CoA reductase (NADPH)
 : crotonyl-CoA carboxylase/reductase
 : crotonyl-CoA reductase
 : 3-(cis-5,6-dihydroxycyclohexa-1,3-dien-1-yl)propanoate dehydrogenase
 : tRNA-dihydrouridine16/17 synthase (NAD(P)+)
 : tRNA-dihydrouridine47 synthase (NAD(P)+)
 : tRNA-dihydrouridine20a/20b synthase (NAD(P)+)
 : tRNA-dihydrouridine20 synthase (NAD(P)+)
 : artemisinic aldehyde Δ11(13)-reductase
 : very-long-chain enoyl-CoA reductase
 : polyprenol reductase
 : acrylyl-CoA reductase (NADH)
 : Botryococcus squalene synthase
 : botryococcene synthase
 EC 1.3.1.98: Now known to be catalyzed by two different enzymes, EC 1.3.1.122, (S)-8-oxocitronellyl enol synthase, and EC 5.5.1.34, (+)-cis,trans-nepetalactol synthase	 
 EC 1.3.1.100: chanoclavine-I aldehyde reductase *	 
 EC 1.3.1.101: 2,3-bis-O-geranylgeranyl-sn-glycerol 1-phosphate reductase [NAD(P)H] *	 
 EC 1.3.1.102: 2-alkenal reductase (NADP+) *	 
 EC 1.3.1.103: 2-haloacrylate reductase *	 
 EC 1.3.1.104: enoyl-[acyl-carrier-protein] reductase (NADPH) *	 
 EC 1.3.1.105: 2-methylene-furan-3-one reductase *	 
 EC 1.3.1.106: cobalt-precorrin-6A reductase *	 
 EC 1.3.1.107: sanguinarine reductase *	 
 EC 1.3.1.108: caffeoyl-CoA reductase *	 
 EC 1.3.1.109: butanoyl-CoA dehydrogenase complex (NAD+, ferredoxin) *	 
 EC 1.3.1.110: lactate dehydrogenase (NAD+,ferredoxin) *	 
 EC 1.3.1.111: geranylgeranyl-bacteriochlorophyllide a reductase *	 
 EC 1.3.1.112: anthocyanidin reductase [(2S)-flavan-3-ol-forming] *	 
 EC 1.3.1.113: (4-alkanoyl-5-oxo-2,5-dihydrofuran-3-yl)methyl phosphate reductase *	 
 EC 1.3.1.114: 3-dehydro-bile acid Δ4,6-reductase *	 
 EC 1.3.1.115: 3-oxocholoyl-CoA 4-desaturase *	 
 EC 1.3.1.116: 7β-hydroxy-3-oxochol-24-oyl-CoA 4-desaturase *	 
 EC 1.3.1.117: hydroxycinnamoyl-CoA reductase *	 
 EC 1.3.1.118: meromycolic acid enoyl-[acyl-carrier-protein] reductase *	 
 EC 1.3.1.119: chlorobenzene dihydrodiol dehydrogenase *	 
 EC 1.3.1.120: cyclohexane-1-carbonyl-CoA reductase NADP+) *	 
 EC 1.3.1.121: 4-amino-4-deoxyprephenate dehydrogenase *	 
 EC 1.3.1.122: (S)-8-oxocitronellyl enol synthase *	 
 EC 1.3.1.123: 8-oxogeranial reductase *	 
 EC 1.3.1.124: 2,4-dienoyl-CoA reductase [(3E)-enoyl-CoA-producing] *	 
 *No Wikipedia article

EC 1.3.2 With a cytochrome as acceptor
 : now EC 1.3.99.2
 : now EC 1.3.99.3
 : galactonolactone dehydrogenase

EC 1.3.3 With oxygen as acceptor
 : dihydroorotate oxidase
 : lathosterol oxidase
 : coproporphyrinogen oxidase
 : protoporphyrinogen oxidase
 : bilirubin oxidase
 : acyl-CoA oxidase
 : dihydrouracil oxidase
 : tetrahydroberberine oxidase
 : secologanin synthase
 : tryptophan a,b-oxidase
 : pyrroloquinoline-quinone synthase
 : l-galactonolactone oxidase

EC 1.3.5 With a quinone or related compound as acceptor
 : succinate dehydrogenase (quinone)
 : dihydroorotate dehydrogenase (quinone)
 : protoporphyrinogen IX dehydrogenase (menaquinone)
 : fumarate reductase (quinol)
 : 15-cis-phytoene desaturase
 : 9,9'-dicis-zeta-carotene desaturase

EC 1.3.7 With an iron–sulfur protein as acceptor
 : 6-hydroxynicotinate reductase
 : 15,16-dihydrobiliverdin:ferredoxin oxidoreductase
 : phycoerythrobilin:ferredoxin oxidoreductase
 : phytochromobilin:ferredoxin oxidoreductase
 : phycocyanobilin:ferredoxin oxidoreductase
 : phycoerythrobilin synthase
 : ferredoxin:protochlorophyllide reductase (ATP-dependent)
 : benzoyl-CoA reductase
 : 4-hydroxybenzoyl-CoA reductase
 : pentalenolactone synthase

 : chlorophyllide a reductase

EC 1.3.8 With a flavin as acceptor
 : short-chain acyl-CoA dehydrogenase
 : 4,4′-diapophytoene desaturase (4,4′-diapolycopene-forming)
 :  (R)-benzylsuccinyl-CoA dehydrogenase
 : isovaleryl-CoA dehydrogenase
 : 2-methyl-branched-chain-enoyl-CoA reductase
 : glutaryl-CoA dehydrogenase (ETF)
 : medium-chain acyl-CoA dehydrogenase
 : long-chain acyl-CoA dehydrogenase
 : very-long-chain acyl-CoA dehydrogenase
 EC 1.3.8.10: cyclohex-1-ene-1-carbonyl-CoA dehydrogenase *
 EC 1.3.8.11: cyclohexane-1-carbonyl-CoA dehydrogenase (electron-transfer flavoprotein) *
 EC 1.3.8.12: (2S)-methylsuccinyl-CoA dehydrogenase *
 EC 1.3.8.13: crotonobetainyl-CoA reductase *
 EC 1.3.8.14: L-prolyl-[peptidyl-carrier protein] dehydrogenase *
 EC 1.3.8.15: 3-(aryl)acrylate reductase *
 EC 1.3.8.16: 2-amino-4-deoxychorismate dehydrogenase *
 EC 1.3.8.17: dehydro coenzyme F420 reductase *
 *No Wikipedia article

EC 1.3.98 With FMN acceptor
 : dihydroorotate dehydrogenase (fumarate)
 EC 1.3.98.2: Now EC 1.3.4.1, fumarate reductase (CoM/CoB)
 EC 1.3.98.3: coproporphyrinogen dehydrogenase *
 EC 1.3.98.4: 5a,11a-dehydrotetracycline reductase *
 EC 1.3.98.5: hydrogen peroxide-dependent heme synthase *
 EC 1.3.98.6: AdoMet-dependent heme synthase *
 EC 1.3.98.7: [mycofactocin precursor peptide]-tyrosine decarboxylase 
 *No Wikipedia article

EC 1.3.99 With unknown physiological acceptors
 EC 1.3.99.1: The activity is included in EC 1.3.5.1, succinate dehydrogenase (quinone)
 EC 1.3.99.2: Now EC 1.3.8.1, butyryl-CoA dehydrogenase.
 EC 1.3.99.3: now EC 1.3.8.7, medium-chain acyl-CoA dehydrogenase, EC 1.3.8.8, long-chain acyl-CoA dehydrogenase and EC 1.3.8.9, very-long-chain acyl-CoA dehydrogenase
 : 3-oxosteroid 1-dehydrogenase
 : 3-oxo-5α-steroid 4-dehydrogenase (acceptor)
 : 3-oxo-5β-steroid 4-dehydrogenase
 EC 1.3.99.7: Now EC 1.3.8.6, glutaryl-CoA dehydrogenase
 : 2-furoyl-CoA dehydrogenase
 EC 1.3.99.9: Now EC 1.21.99.1, β-cyclopiazonate dehydrogenase
 EC 1.3.99.10: Now EC 1.3.8.4, isovaleryl-CoA dehydrogenase
 EC 1.3.99.11: transferred to EC 1.3.5.2, dihydroorotate dehydrogenase
 EC 1.3.99.12: Now classified as EC 1.3.8.5, 2-methyl-branched-chain-enoyl-CoA reductase
 : Now EC 1.3.8.8, long-chain-acyl-CoA dehydrogenase
 : cyclohexanone dehydrogenase
 EC 1.3.99.15: Now EC 1.3.7.8
 : isoquinoline 1-oxidoreductase
 : quinoline 2-oxidoreductase
 : quinaldate 4-oxidoreductase
 : quinoline-4-carboxylate 2-oxidoreductase
 EC 1.3.99.20: Now EC 1.3.7.9, 4-hydroxybenzoyl-CoA reductase
 EC 1.3.99.21: Now EC 1.3.8.3, (R)-benzylsuccinyl-CoA dehydrogenase
 EC 1.3.99.22: Now EC 1.3.98.3, coproporphyrinogen dehydrogenase
 : all-trans-retinol 13,14-reductase
 EC 1.3.99.24:  Now EC 1.3.8.16, 2-amino-4-deoxychorismate dehydrogenase
 : carvone reductase
 : all-trans-ζ-carotene desaturase
 : 1-hydroxycarotenoid 3,4-desaturase
 : phytoene desaturase (neurosporene-forming)
 : phytoene desaturase (zeta-carotene-forming)
 : phytoene desaturase (3,4-didehydrolycopene-forming)
 : phytoene desaturase (lycopene-forming)
 : glutaryl-CoA dehydrogenase (non-decarboxylating)
 EC 1.3.99.33: urocanate reductase *
 EC 1.3.99.34: Now classified as EC 1.3.7.11, 2,3-bis-O-geranylgeranyl-sn-glycero-phospholipid reductase
 EC 1.3.99.35: Now EC 1.3.7.15, chlorophyllide a reductase *
 EC 1.3.99.36: cypemycin cysteine dehydrogenase (decarboxylating) *
 EC 1.3.99.37: 1-hydroxy-2-isopentenylcarotenoid 3,4-desaturase *
 EC 1.3.99.38: menaquinone-9 β-reductase *
 EC 1.3.99.39: carotenoid φ-ring synthase *
 EC 1.3.99.40: carotenoid χ-ring synthase *
 *No Wikipedia article

EC 1.4 Acting on the CH-NH2 group of donors
EC 1.4.1 With NAD+ or NADP+ as acceptor
 : alanine dehydrogenase
 : glutamate dehydrogenase
 : glutamate dehydrogenase (NAD(P)+)
 : glutamate dehydrogenase (NADP+)
 : L-amino-acid dehydrogenase
 EC 1.4.1.6: deleted, Now included with EC 1.21.4.1, D-proline reductase (dithiol)
 : serine 2-dehydrogenase
 : valine dehydrogenase (NADP+)
 : leucine dehydrogenase
 : glycine dehydrogenase
 : L-erythro-3,5-diaminohexanoate dehydrogenase
 : 2,4-diaminopentanoate dehydrogenase
 : glutamate synthase (NADPH)
 : glutamate synthase (NADH)
 : lysine dehydrogenase
 : diaminopimelate dehydrogenase
 : N-methylalanine dehydrogenase
 : lysine 6-dehydrogenase
 : tryptophan dehydrogenase
 : phenylalanine dehydrogenase
 : aspartate dehydrogenase
 EC 1.4.1.22: there is no overall consumption of NAD+ during the reaction. As a result, transfer of the enzyme from EC 4.3.1.12 was not necessary and EC 1.4.1.22 was withdrawn before being made official
 : valine dehydrogenase (NAD+)
 : 3-dehydroquinate synthase II
 EC 1.4.1.25: L-arginine dehydrogenase *	 
 EC 1.4.1.26: 2,4-diaminopentanoate dehydrogenase (NAD+) *	 
 EC 1.4.1.27: glycine cleavage system *
 *No Wikipedia article

EC 1.4.2 With a cytochrome as acceptor
 : glycine dehydrogenase (cytochrome)

EC 1.4.3 With oxygen as acceptor
 : D-aspartate oxidase
 : L-amino-acid oxidase
 : D-amino-acid oxidase
 : monoamine oxidase
 : pyridoxal 5′-phosphate synthase
 EC 1.4.3.6: replaced by two enzymes, EC 1.4.3.21 (primary-amine oxidase) and EC 1.4.3.22 (diamine oxidase)
 : D-glutamate oxidase
 : ethanolamine oxidase
 EC 1.4.3.9:  Now included with EC 1.4.3.4 amine oxidase (flavin-containing)
 : putrescine oxidase
 : L-glutamate oxidase
 : cyclohexylamine oxidase
 : protein-lysine 6-oxidase
 : L-lysine oxidase
 : D-glutamate(D-aspartate) oxidase
 : L-aspartate oxidase
 EC 1.4.3.17: Now EC 1.3.3.10, tryptophan α,β-oxidase
 EC 1.4.3.18: Not approved as the enzyme was shown to be a dehydrogenase and not an oxidase (see EC 1.5.99.12, cytokinin dehydrogenase)
 : glycine oxidase
 : L-lysine 6-oxidase
 : primary-amine oxidase
 : diamine oxidase
 : 7-chloro-L-tryptophan oxidase
 : pseudooxynicotine oxidase
 EC 1.4.3.25: L-arginine oxidase *	 
 EC 1.4.3.26: pre-mycofactocin synthase *
 *No Wikipedia article

EC 1.4.4 With a disulfide as acceptor
 EC 1.4.4.1: Now EC 1.21.4.1, D-proline reductase (dithiol)
 : glycine dehydrogenase (aminomethyl-transferring)

EC 1.4.5 With a quinone or other compound as acceptor
 : D-amino acid dehydrogenase (quinone)

EC 1.4.7 With an iron–sulfur protein as acceptor
 : glutamate synthase (ferredoxin)

EC 1.4.9 With a copper protein as acceptor
 : methylamine dehydrogenase (amicyanin)
 : aralkylamine dehydrogenase (azurin)

EC 1.4.98 With tryptophan tryptophylquinone acceptors
 : methylamine dehydrogenase (amicyanin)

EC 1.4.99 With unknown physiological acceptors
 EC 1.4.99.1:  Now lEC 1.4.99.6, D-arginine dehydrogenase
 : taurine dehydrogenase
 EC 1.4.99.3: Now EC 1.4.9.1, methylamine dehydrogenase (amicyanin)
 EC 1.4.99.4: Now EC 1.4.9.2, aralkylamine dehydrogenase (azurin)
 : glycine dehydrogenase (cyanide-forming)
 EC 1.4.99.6: D-arginine dehydrogenase *
 *No Wikipedia article

EC 1.5 Acting on the CH-NH group of donors
EC 1.5.1 With NAD+ or NADP+ as acceptor
 : 1-piperideine-2-carboxylate/1-pyrroline-2-carboxylate reductase [NAD(P)H
 : pyrroline-5-carboxylate reductase
 : dihydrofolate reductase
 EC 1.5.1.4: Now included with EC 1.5.1.3 dihydrofolate reductase
 : methylenetetrahydrofolate dehydrogenase (NADP+)
 : formyltetrahydrofolate dehydrogenase
 : saccharopine dehydrogenase (NAD+, L-lysine-forming)
 : saccharopine dehydrogenase (NADP+, L-lysine-forming)
 : saccharopine dehydrogenase (NAD+, L-glutamate-forming)
 : saccharopine dehydrogenase (NADP+, L-glutamate-forming)
 : D-octopine dehydrogenase
 EC 1.5.1.12: Now EC 1.2.1.88, L-glutamate γ-semialdehyde dehydrogenase
 EC 1.5.1.13: Now EC 1.17.1.5, nicotinate dehydrogenase
 EC 1.5.1.14: Now included with EC 1.5.1.21 Δ1-piperideine-2-carboxylate reductase
 : methylenetetrahydrofolate dehydrogenase (NAD+)
 : D-lysopine dehydrogenase
 : alanopine dehydrogenase
 : ephedrine dehydrogenase
 : D-nopaline dehydrogenase
 : methylenetetrahydrofolate reductase (NAD(P)H)
 : 1-piperideine-2-carboxylate/1-pyrroline-2-carboxylate reductase (NADPH)
 : strombine dehydrogenase
 : tauropine dehydrogenase
 : N5-(carboxyethyl)ornithine synthase
 : thiomorpholine-carboxylate dehydrogenase
 : β-alanopine dehydrogenase
 : 1,2-dehydroreticulinium reductase (NADPH)
 : opine dehydrogenase
 EC 1.5.1.29: Now covered by EC 1.5.1.38 [FMN reductase (NADPH)], EC 1.5.1.39 [FMN reductase [NAD(P)H])] and EC 1.5.1.41 (riboflavin reductase [NAD(P)H])
 : flavin reductase (NADPH)
 : berberine reductase
 : vomilenine reductase
 : pteridine reductase
 : 6,7-dihydropteridine reductase
 EC 1.5.1.35: identical to EC 1.2.1.19, aminobutyraldehyde dehydrogenase, as the substrates 1-pyrroline and 4-aminobutanal are interconvertible
 : flavin reductase (NADH)
 : FAD reductase (NADH)
 : FMN reductase (NADPH)
 : FMN reductase (NAD(P)H)
 : 8-hydroxy-5-deazaflavin:NADPH oxidoreductase
 : riboflavin reductase (NAD(P)H)
 : FMN reductase (NADH)
 : carboxynorspermidine synthase
 : festuclavine dehydrogenase
 : FAD reductase (NAD(P)H)
 EC 1.5.1.46: agroclavine dehydrogenase * 
 EC 1.5.1.47: dihydromethanopterin reductase [NAD(P)+] * 
 EC 1.5.1.48: 2-methyl-1-pyrroline reductase * 
 EC 1.5.1.49: 1-pyrroline-2-carboxylate reductase [NAD(P)H] * 
 EC 1.5.1.50: dihydromonapterin reductase * 
 EC 1.5.1.51: N-[(2S)-2-amino-2-carboxyethyl]-L-lutamate dehydrogenase * 
 EC 1.5.1.52: staphylopine dehydrogenase * 
 EC 1.5.1.53: methylenetetrahydrofolate reductase (NADPH) * 
 EC 1.5.1.54: methylenetetrahydrofolate reductase (NADH) * 
 *No Wikipedia article

EC 1.5.3 With oxygen as acceptor
 : sarcosine oxidase
 : N-methyl-L-amino-acid oxidase
 EC 1.5.3.3: deleted
 : N 6-methyl-lysine oxidase
 : (S)-6-hydroxynicotine oxidase
 : (R)-6-hydroxynicotine oxidase
 : L-pipecolate oxidase
 EC 1.5.3.8: Now included with EC 1.3.3.8, tetrahydroberberine oxidase
 EC 1.5.3.9: Now EC 1.21.3.3, reticuline oxidase
 : dimethylglycine oxidase
 EC 1.5.3.11: Now included with EC 1.5.3.13 (N 1-acetylpolyamine oxidase), EC 1.5.3.14 (polyamine oxidase (propane-1,3-diamine-forming)), EC 1.5.3.15 (N 8-acetylspermidine oxidase (propane-1,3-diamine-forming)), EC 1.5.3.16 (spermine oxidase) and EC 1.5.3.17 (non-specific polyamine oxidase)
 : dihydrobenzophenanthridine oxidase
 : N1-acetylpolyamine oxidase
 : polyamine oxidase (propane-1,3-diamine-forming)
 : N 8-acetylspermidine oxidase (propane-1,3-diamine-forming)
 : spermine oxidase
 : non-specific polyamine oxidase
 : L-saccharopine oxidase
 : 4-methylaminobutanoate oxidase (formaldehyde-forming)
 : N-alkylglycine oxidase
 : 4-methylaminobutanoate oxidase (methylamine-forming)
 EC 1.5.3.22: coenzyme F420H2 oxidase *	 
 EC 1.5.3.23: glyphosate oxidoreductase *
 *No Wikipedia article

EC 1.5.4 With a disulfide as acceptor
 : pyrimidodiazepine synthase

EC 1.5.5 With a quinone or similar compound as acceptor
 : electron-transferring-flavoprotein dehydrogenase
 EC 1.5.5.2: proline dehydrogenase *
 EC 1.5.5.3: hydroxyproline dehydrogenase *
 *No Wikipedia article

EC 1.5.7 With an iron–sulfur protein as acceptor
 : methylenetetrahydrofolate reductase (ferredoxin)
 EC 1.5.7.2: coenzyme F420 oxidoreductase (ferredoxin) *
 *No Wikipedia article

EC 1.5.8 With a flavin or flavoprotein as acceptor
 : dimethylamine dehydrogenase
 : trimethylamine dehydrogenase
 : sarcosine dehydrogenase
 : dimethylglycine dehydrogenase

EC 1.5.98 With other, known, physiological acceptors
 EC 1.5.98.1: ethylenetetrahydromethanopterin dehydrogenase	 
 EC 1.5.98.2: 5,10-methylenetetrahydromethanopterin reductase	 
 EC 1.5.98.3: coenzyme F420:methanophenazine dehydrogenase

EC 1.5.99 With unknown physiological acceptors
 EC 1.5.99.1: Now EC 1.5.8.3, sarcosine dehydrogenase
 EC 1.5.99.2: Now EC 1.5.8.4, dimethylglycine dehydrogenase
 : L-pipecolate dehydrogenase
 : nicotine dehydrogenase
 : methylglutamate dehydrogenase
 : spermidine dehydrogenase
 EC 1.5.99.7: Now EC 1.5.8.2, trimethylamine dehydrogenase
 EC 1.5.99.8: Now EC 1.5.5.2, proline dehydrogenase
 EC 1.5.99.9: transferred to EC 1.5.98.1, methylenetetrahydromethanopterin dehydrogenase
 EC 1.5.99.10: Now EC 1.5.8.1, dimethylamine dehydrogenase
 EC 1.5.99.11:  transferred to EC 1.5.98.2, 5,10-methylenetetrahydromethanopterin reductase
 : cytokinin dehydrogenase
 : D-proline dehydrogenase
 : 6-hydroxypseudooxynicotine dehydrogenase
 EC 1.5.99.15: dihydromethanopterin reductase (acceptor) *
 *No Wikipedia article

EC 1.6 Acting on NADH or NADPH
EC 1.6.1 With NAD or NADP as acceptor
 : NAD(P)+ transhydrogenase (Si-specific)
 : NAD(P)+ transhydrogenase (Re/Si-specific)

EC 1.6.2 With a heme protein as acceptor
 EC 1.6.2.1: now EC 1.6.99.3 NADH dehydrogenase
 : cytochrome-b5 reductase
 EC 1.6.2.3: deleted
 : NADPH—hemoprotein reductase
 : NADPH—cytochrome-c2 reductase
 : leghemoglobin reductase

EC 1.6.3 With oxygen as acceptor
 : NAD(P)H oxidase (H2O2-forming)
 EC 1.6.3.2: NAD(P)H oxidase (H2O-forming) *
 EC 1.6.3.3: NADH oxidase (H2O2-forming) *
 EC 1.6.3.4: NADH oxidase (H2O-forming) *
 EC 1.6.3.5: renalase *
 *No Wikipedia article

EC 1.6.4 With a disulfide as acceptor (deleted sub-class)
 EC 1.6.4.1: now  cystine reductase
 EC 1.6.4.2: now  glutathione-disulfide reductase	 
 EC 1.6.4.3: now  dihydrolipoyl dehydrogenase
 EC 1.6.4.4: now  protein-disulfide reductase
 EC 1.6.4.5: now  thioredoxin-disulfide reductase
 EC 1.6.4.6: now  CoA-glutathione reductase
 EC 1.6.4.7: now  asparagusate reductase
 EC 1.6.4.8: now  trypanothione-disulfide reductase
 EC 1.6.4.9: now  bis-γ-glutamylcystine reductase
 EC 1.6.4.10: now  CoA-disulfide reductase

EC 1.6.5 With a quinone or similar compound as acceptor
 EC 1.6.5.1: deleted
 : NAD(P)H dehydrogenase (quinone)
 EC 1.6.5.3: now  NADH:ubiquinone reductase (H+-translocating)
 : monodehydroascorbate reductase (NADH)
 : NADPH:quinone reductase
 : p-benzoquinone reductase (NADPH)
 : 2-hydroxy-1,4-benzoquinone reductase
 : Now , NADH:ubiquinone reductase (Na+-transporting)
 : NADH:ubiquinone reductase (non-electrogenic)
 : NADPH dehydrogenase (quinone)
 EC 1.6.5.12: demethylphylloquinone reductase *
 *No Wikipedia article

EC 1.6.6 With a nitrogenous group as acceptor
 EC 1.6.6.1: Now , nitrate reductase (NADH)
 EC 1.6.6.2: Now , nitrate reductase [NAD(P)H]
 EC 1.6.6.3: Now , nitrate reductase (NADPH)
 EC 1.6.6.4: Now , nitrite reductase [NAD(P)H]
 EC 1.6.6.5: Now , nitrite reductase (NO-forming)
 EC 1.6.6.6: Now , hyponitrite reductase
 EC 1.6.6.7: Now , azobenzene reductase
 EC 1.6.6.8: Now , GMP reductase
 EC 1.6.6.10: Now , nitroquinoline-N-oxide reductase]
 EC 1.6.6.11: Now , hydroxylamine reductase (NADH)
 EC 1.6.6.12: Now , 4-(dimethylamino)phenylazoxybenzene reductase
 EC 1.6.6.13: Now , N-hydroxy-2-acetamidofluorene reductase

EC 1.6.7 With an iron–sulfur protein as acceptor (deleted sub-subclass)
 EC 1.6.7.1: now  ferredoxin—NADP+ reductase
 EC 1.6.7.2: now  rubredoxin—NAD+ reductase
  EC 1.6.7.3: now  ferredoxin—NAD+ reductase

EC 1.6.8 With a flavin as acceptor (deleted sub-subclass)
 EC 1.6.8.1: Now  FMN reductase
 EC 1.6.8.2: Now  flavin reductase

EC 1.6.99 With unknown physiological acceptors
 : NADPH dehydrogenase
 EC 1.6.99.2: Now , NAD(P)H dehydrogenase (quinone
 EC 1.6.99.4: Now , ferredoxin—NADP+ reductase
 EC 1.6.99.5: Now , NADH dehydrogenase (quinone)
 EC 1.6.99.6: Now , NADPH dehydrogenase (quinone)
 EC 1.6.99.7: Now , 6,7-dihydropteridine reductase
 EC 1.6.99.8: Deleted
 EC 1.6.99.9: Now , cob(II)alamin reductase
 EC 1.6.99.11: Deleted
 EC 1.6.99.12: Now , cyanocobalamin reductase (cyanide-eliminating)
 EC 1.6.99.13: Now , ferric-chelate reductase

EC 1.7 Acting on other nitrogenous compounds as donors
EC 1.7.1 With NAD+ or NADP+ as acceptor
 : nitrate reductase (NADH)
 : nitrate reductase (NAD(P)H)
 : nitrate reductase (NADPH)
 : nitrite reductase (NAD(P)H)
 : hyponitrite reductase
 : azobenzene reductase
 : GMP reductase
 EC 1.7.1.8: deleted
 : nitroquinoline-N-oxide reductase
 : hydroxylamine reductase (NADH)
 : 4-(dimethylamino)phenylazoxybenzene reductase
 : N-hydroxy-2-acetamidofluorene reductase
 : preQ1 synthase
 : nitric oxide reductase (NAD(P), nitrous oxide-forming)
 : nitrite reductase (NADH)	 
 : nitrobenzene nitroreductase	 
 : FMN-dependent NADH-azoreductase

EC 1.7.2 With a cytochrome as acceptor
 : nitrite reductase (NO-forming)
 : nitrite reductase (cytochrome; ammonia-forming)
 : trimethylamine-N-oxide reductase
 : nitrous-oxide reductase
 : nitric oxide reductase (cytochrome c)
 : hydroxylamine dehydrogenase
 : hydrazine synthase *	 
 : hydrazine dehydrogenase * 
 *No Wikipedia article

EC 1.7.3 With oxygen as acceptor
 : nitroalkane oxidase
 : acetylindoxyl oxidase
 : factor-independent urate hydroxylase
 : 3-aci-nitropropanoate oxidase
 : hydroxylamine oxidase (cytochrome) *
 *No Wikipedia article

EC 1.7.5 With a quinone or similar compound as acceptor
 : nitrate reductase (quinone)
 : nitric oxide reductase (menaquinol)

EC 1.7.6 With a nitrogenous group as acceptor
 : nitrite dismutase

EC 1.7.7 With an iron–sulfur protein as acceptor
 : ferredoxin—nitrite reductase
 : ferredoxin—nitrate reductase

EC 1.7.99 With other acceptors
 : hydroxylamine reductase
 EC 1.7.99.2: deleted: reaction may have been due to the combined action of  nitrous-oxide reductase and  nitric-oxide reductase
 EC 1.7.99.6: Now  nitrous-oxide reductase
 EC 1.7.99.7: Now  nitric oxide reductase (cytochrome c)
 : hydroxylamine oxidoreductase

EC 1.8 Acting on a sulfur group of donors
EC 1.8.1 With NAD+ or NADP+ as acceptor
 EC 1.8.1.1: deleted
 : sulfite reductase (NADPH)
 : hypotaurine dehydrogenase
 : dihydrolipoyl dehydrogenase
 : 2-oxopropyl-CoM reductase (carboxylating)
 : cystine reductase
 : glutathione-disulfide reductase
 : protein-disulfide reductase
 : thioredoxin-disulfide reductase
 : CoA-glutathione reductase
 : asparagusate reductase
 : trypanothione-disulfide reductase
 :  bis-γ-glutamylcystine reductase
 : CoA-disulfide reductase
 : mycothione reductase
 : glutathione amide reductase
 : dimethylsulfone reductase
 : NAD(P)H sulfur oxidoreductase (CoA-dependent) *
 : sulfide dehydrogenase *
 : 4,4′-dithiodibutanoate disulfide reductase *
 : dissimilatory dimethyldisulfide reductase *
 *No Wikipedia article

EC 1.8.2 With a cytochrome as acceptor
 : sulfite dehydrogenase (cytochrome)
 : thiosulfate dehydrogenase
 : sulfide-cytochrome-c reductase (flavocytochrome c)
 : dimethyl sulfide:cytochrome c2 reductase *
 : thiosulfate reductase (cytochrome) *
 : S-disulfanyl-L-cysteine oxidoreductase *
 : thiocyanate desulfurase *
 *No Wikipedia article

EC 1.8.3 With oxygen as acceptor
 : sulfite oxidase
 : thiol oxidase
 : glutathione oxidase
 : methanethiol oxidase
 : prenylcysteine oxidase
 : farnesylcysteine lyase
 : formylglycine-generating enzyme *
 *No Wikipedia article

EC 1.8.4 With a disulfide as acceptor
 : glutathione—homocystine transhydrogenase
 : protein-disulfide reductase (glutathione)
 : glutathione—CoA-glutathione transhydrogenase
 : glutathione—cystine transhydrogenase
 : enzyme-thiol transhydrogenase (glutathione-disulfide)
 : phosphoadenylyl-sulfate reductase (thioredoxin)
 : adenylyl-sulfate reductase (glutathione)
 : adenylyl-sulfate reductase (thioredoxin)
 : peptide-methionine (S)-S-oxide reductase
 :  peptide-methionine (R)-S-oxide reductase
 : L-methionine (S)-S-oxide reductase
 : L-methionine (R)-S-oxide reductase
 : protein dithiol oxidoreductase (disulfide-forming) *
 : thioredoxin:protein disulfide reductase *
 *No Wikipedia article

EC 1.8.5 With a quinone or similar compound as acceptor
 : glutathione dehydrogenase (ascorbate)
 : thiosulfate dehydrogenase (quinone)
 : respiratory dimethylsulfoxide reductase
 : bacterial sulfide:quinone reductase
 : thiosulfate reductase (quinone) *	 
 : sulfite dehydrogenase (quinone) *	 
 : glutathionyl-hydroquinone reductase *
 : eukaryotic sulfide quinone oxidoreductase *
 : protein dithiol:quinone oxidoreductase DsbB *
 *No Wikipedia article

EC 1.8.6 With a nitrogenous group as acceptor (deleted sub-subclass)
 : Now included with  glutathione transferase

EC 1.8.7 With an iron–sulfur protein as acceptor
 : assimilatory sulfite reductase (ferredoxin)
 : ferredoxin:thioredoxin reductase
 : ferredoxin:CoB-CoM heterodisulfide reductase *
 *No Wikipedia article

EC 1.8.98 With other, known, acceptors
 : dihydromethanophenazine:CoB-CoM heterodisulfide reductase
 : sulfiredoxin

EC 1.8.99 With other acceptors
 : adenylyl-sulfate reductase
 EC 1.8.99.4: Now , phosphoadenylyl-sulfate reductase (thioredoxin)
 EC 1.8.99.5: dissimilatory sulfite reductase *
 *No Wikipedia article

EC 1.9 Acting on a heme group of donors
EC 1.9.3 With oxygen as acceptor
 EC 1.9.3.1: Now , cytochrome-c oxidase

EC 1.9.6 With a nitrogenous group as acceptor
 : nitrate reductase (cytochrome)

EC 1.9.98 With other, known, physiological acceptors
 : iron—cytochrome-c reductase

EC 1.9.99 With other acceptors
 EC 1.9.99.1: Now , iron—cytochrome-c reductase

EC 1.10 Acting on diphenols and related substances as donors
EC 1.10.1 With NAD+ or NADP+ as acceptor
 : trans-acenaphthene-1,2-diol dehydrogenase

EC 1.10.2 With a cytochrome as acceptor
 EC 1.10.2.2: Now , quinol—cytochrome-c reductase

EC 1.10.3 With oxygen as acceptor
 : catechol oxidase
 : laccase
 : L-ascorbate oxidase
 : o-aminophenol oxidase
 : 3-hydroxyanthranilate oxidase
 : rifamycin-B oxidase
 EC 1.10.3.7: Now , sulochrin oxidase [(+)-bisdechlorogeodin-forming]
 EC 1.10.3.8: Now , sulochrin oxidase [(-)-bisdechlorogeodin-forming]
 : photosystem II
 EC 1.10.3.10: Now , ubiquinol oxidase (H+-transporting)	 
 : ubiquinol oxidase (non-electrogenic)
 : Now , menaquinol oxidase (H +-transporting)
 EC 1.10.3.13: Now , caldariellaquinol oxidase (H+-transporting)	 
 EC 1.10.3.14: Now , ubiquinol oxidase (electrogenic, proton-motive force generating)	 
 : grixazone synthase	* 
 : dihydrophenazinedicarboxylate synthase	* 
 : superoxide oxidase *
 *No Wikipedia article

EC 1.10.5 With a quinone or related compound as acceptor
 : ribosyldihydronicotinamide dehydrogenase (quinone)
 *No Wikipedia article

EC 1.10.9 With a copper protein as acceptor
 EC 1.10.9.1: Now , plastoquinol—plastocyanin reductase

EC 1.10.99 With unknown physiological acceptors
 EC 1.10.99.1: Now  plastoquinol—plastocyanin reductase
 EC 1.10.99.2: Now  ribosyldihydronicotinamide dehydrogenase (quinone)
 EC 1.10.99.3: Now  violaxanthin de-epoxidase

EC 1.11 Acting on a peroxide as acceptor
EC 1.11.1 Peroxidases
 : NADH peroxidase
 : NADPH peroxidase
 : fatty-acid peroxidase
 EC 1.11.1.4: Now  tryptophan 2,3-dioxygenase
 : cytochrome-c peroxidase
 : catalase
 : peroxidase
 : iodide peroxidase
 : glutathione peroxidase
 : chloride peroxidase
 : L-ascorbate peroxidase
 : phospholipid-hydroperoxide glutathione peroxidase
 : manganese peroxidase
 : lignin peroxidase
 : versatile peroxidase
 : glutathione amide-dependent peroxidase
 : bromide peroxidase
 : dye decolorizing peroxidase
 : prostamide/prostaglandin F2α synthase
 : catalase-peroxidase
 : hydroperoxy fatty acid reductase *
 : (S)-2-hydroxypropylphosphonic acid epoxidase *
 : thioredoxin-dependent peroxiredoxin *
 : glutaredoxin-dependent peroxiredoxin *
 : NADH-dependent peroxiredoxin *
 : glutathione-dependent peroxiredoxin *
 : lipoyl-dependent peroxiredoxin *
 : mycoredoxin-dependent peroxiredoxin *
 *No Wikipedia article

EC 1.11.2 Peroxygenase
 : unspecific peroxygenase
 : myeloperoxidase
 : plant seed peroxygenase
 : fatty-acid peroxygenase
 : 3-methyl-L-tyrosine peroxygenase *	 
 :	L-tyrosine peroxygenase *
 *No Wikipedia article

EC 1.12 Acting on hydrogen as donor
EC 1.12.1 With NAD+ or NADP+ as acceptor
 : Now EC 1.12.7.2, ferredoxin hydrogenase
 : hydrogen dehydrogenase
 : hydrogen dehydrogenase (NADP+)
 : hydrogenase (NAD+, ferredoxin)
 : hydrogen dehydrogenase [NAD(P)+] *
 *No Wikipedia article

EC 1.12.2 With a cytochrome as acceptor
 : cytochrome-c3 hydrogenase

EC 1.12.5 With a quinone or similar compound as acceptor
 : hydrogen:quinone oxidoreductase

EC 1.12.7 With an iron–sulfur protein as acceptor
 EC 1.12.7.1: Now , ferredoxin hydrogenase
 : ferredoxin hydrogenase

EC 1.12.98 With other known acceptors
 : coenzyme F420 hydrogenase
 : 5,10-methenyltetrahydromethanopterin hydrogenase
 : Methanosarcina-phenazine hydrogenase
 : Sulfhydrogenase

EC 1.12.99 With unknown physiological acceptors
 EC 1.12.99.1: Now , coenzyme F420 hydrogenase
 EC 1.12.99.3: Now , hydrogen:quinone oxidoreductase
 EC 1.12.99.4: Now , 5,10-methenyltetrahydromethanopterin hydrogenase
 : hydrogenase (acceptor)

EC 1.13 Acting on single donors with incorporation of molecular oxygen (oxygenases)
EC 1.13.11 With incorporation of two atoms of oxygen
 : catechol 1,2-dioxygenase
 : catechol 2,3-dioxygenase
 : protocatechuate 3,4-dioxygenase
 : gentisate 1,2-dioxygenase
 : homogentisate 1,2-dioxygenase
 : 3-hydroxyanthranilate 3,4-dioxygenase
 EC 1.13.11.7: deleted
 : protocatechuate 4,5-dioxygenase
 : 2,5-dihydroxypyridine 5,6-dioxygenase
 : 7,8-dihydroxykynurenate 8,8a-dioxygenase
 : tryptophan 2,3-dioxygenase
 : linoleate 13S-lipoxygenas
 EC 1.13.11.13:  The activity is the sum of several enzymatic and spontaneous reactions
 : 2,3-dihydroxybenzoate 3,4-dioxygenase
 : 3,4-dihydroxyphenylacetate 2,3-dioxygenase
 : 3-carboxyethylcatechol 2,3-dioxygenase
 : indole 2,3-dioxygenase
 : persulfide dioxygenase
 : cysteamine dioxygenase
 : cysteine dioxygenase
 EC 1.13.11.21: Now , β-carotene 15,15′-monooxygenase	 
 : caffeate 3,4-dioxygenase
 : 2,3-dihydroxyindole 2,3-dioxygenase
 : quercetin 2,3-dioxygenase
 : 3,4-dihydroxy-9,10-secoandrosta-1,3,5(10)-triene-9,17-dione 4,5-dioxygenase
 : peptide-tryptophan 2,3-dioxygenase
 : 4-hydroxyphenylpyruvate dioxygenase
 : 2,3-dihydroxybenzoate 2,3-dioxygenase
 : stizolobate synthase
 : stizolobinate synthase
 : arachidonate 12-lipoxygenase
 EC 1.13.11.32: Now , nitronate monooxygenase
 : arachidonate 15-lipoxygenase
 : arachidonate 5-lipoxygenase
 : pyrogallol 1,2-oxygenase
 : chloridazon-catechol dioxygenase
 : hydroxyquinol 1,2-dioxygenase
 : 1-hydroxy-2-naphthoate 1,2-dioxygenase
 : biphenyl-2,3-diol 1,2-dioxygenase
 : arachidonate 8-lipoxygenase
 : 2,4′-dihydroxyacetophenone dioxygenase
 : lignostilbene αβ-dioxygenase
 : linoleate 11-lipoxygenase
 : 4-hydroxymandelate synthase
 : 3-hydroxy-4-oxoquinoline 2,4-dioxygenase
 : 3-hydroxy-2-methyl-quinolin-4-one 2,4-dioxygenase
 : chlorite O2-lyase
 : acetylacetone-cleaving enzyme
 : 9-cis-epoxycarotenoid dioxygenase
 : indoleamine 2,3-dioxygenase
 : acireductone dioxygenase (Ni2+-requiring)
 : acireductone dioxygenase [iron(II)-requiring]
 : sulfur oxygenase/reductase
 : 1,2-dihydroxynaphthalene dioxygenase
 : gallate dioxygenase
 : linoleate 9S-lipoxygenase
 : torulene dioxygenase
 : inoleate 8R-lipoxygenase
 : linolenate 9R-lipoxygenase
 : linoleate 10R-lipoxygenase
 : β-carotene 15,15′-dioxygenase
 : 5-nitrosalicylate dioxygenase
 : carotenoid isomerooxygenase
 : hydroquinone 1,2-dioxygenase
 : 8′-apo-β-carotenoid 14′,13′-cleaving dioxygenase
 : 9-cis-β-carotene 9′,10′-cleaving dioxygenase
 : carlactone synthase
 : all-trans-10′-apo-β-carotenal 13,14-cleaving dioxygenase
 : carotenoid-9′,10′-cleaving dioxygenase
 : 2-hydroxyethylphosphonate dioxygenase
 : methylphosphonate synthase
 : 2-aminophenol 1,6-dioxygenase *
 : all-trans-8′-apo-β-carotenal 15,15′-oxygenase *
 : 2-amino-5-chlorophenol 1,6-dioxygenase *
 : oleate 10S-lipoxygenase *
 : 2-amino-1-hydroxyethylphosphonate dioxygenase (glycine-forming) *
 : aerobic 5,6-dimethylbenzimidazole synthase *
 : (3,5-dihydroxyphenyl)acetyl-CoA 1,2-dioxygenase *
 : 7,8-dihydroneopterin oxygenase *
 : 8′-apo-carotenoid 13,14-cleaving dioxygenase *
 : 4-hydroxy-3-prenylphenylpyruvate oxygenase *
 : crocetin dialdehyde synthase *
 : exo-cleaving rubber dioxygenase *
 : 5-aminosalicylate 1,2-dioxygenase *
 : endo-cleaving rubber dioxygenase *
 : isoeugenol monooxygenase *
 : (hydroxymethyl)phosphonate dioxygenase *
 : [1-hydroxy-2-(trimethylamino)ethyl]phosphonate dioxygenase (glycine-betaine-forming) *
 : 3-mercaptopropionate dioxygenase *
 : fatty acid α-dioxygenase *
 *No Wikipedia article

EC 1.13.12 With incorporation of one atom of oxygen (internal monooxygenases or internal mixed function oxidases)
 : arginine 2-monooxygenase
 : lysine 2-monooxygenase
 : tryptophan 2-monooxygenase
 : lactate 2-monooxygenase
 : Renilla-type luciferase
 : Cypridina-luciferin 2-monooxygenase
 : firefly luciferase
 : Watasenia-luciferin 2-monooxygenase
 : phenylalanine 2-monooxygenase
 : Oplophorus-luciferin 2-monooxygenase
 EC 1.13.12.14: Now , chlorophyllide-a oxygenase
 : 3,4-dihydroxyphenylalanine oxidative deaminase
 : nitronate monooxygenase
 : dichloroarcyriaflavin A synthase
 : dinoflagellate luciferase
 : 2-oxoglutarate dioxygenase (ethene-forming)
 : noranthrone monooxygenase *
 : tetracenomycin-F1 monooxygenase *
 : deoxynogalonate monooxygenase *
 : 4-hydroxy-3-prenylbenzoate synthase *
 : calcium-regulated photoprotein *
 *No Wikipedia article

EC 1.13.99 Miscellaneous
 : inositol oxygenase
 EC 1.13.99.2: Now , benzoate 1,2-dioxygenase
 :   tryptophan 2′-dioxygenase
 EC 1.13.99.4:  Now , 4-chlorophenylacetate 3,4-dioxygenase
 EC 1.13.99.5: now , 3-hydroxy-4-oxoquinoline 2,4-dioxygenase

EC 1.14 Acting on paired donors, with incorporation or reduction of molecular oxygen
EC 1.14.1 With NADH or NADPH as one donor (deleted sub-subclass)
 EC 1.14.1.1: now , unspecific monooxygenase
 EC 1.14.1.2: now , kynurenine 3-monooxygenase
 EC 1.14.1.4: now , kynurenine 7,8-hydroxylase
 EC 1.14.1.5: now ; imidazoleacetate 4-monooxygenase
 EC 1.14.1.6: now , steroid 11β-monooxygenase
 EC 1.14.1.7: now , steroid 17α-monooxygenase
 EC 1.14.1.8: now , steroid 21-monooxygenase
 EC 1.14.1.9: deleted
 EC 1.14.1.10: now  estradiol 6β-monooxygenase
 EC 1.14.1.11: deleted

EC 1.14.2 With ascorbate as one donor (deleted sub-subclass)
 EC 1.14.2.1: now , dopamine β-monooxygenase
 EC 1.14.2.2: now , 4-hydroxyphenylpyruvate dioxygenase

EC 1.14.3 With reduced pteridine as one donor (deleted sub-subclass)
 EC 1.14.3.1: now , phenylalanine 4-monooxygenase

EC 1.14.11 With 2-oxoglutarate as one donor, and incorporation of one atom each of oxygen into both donors
 : γ-butyrobetaine dioxygenase
 : procollagen-proline dioxygenase
 : pyrimidine-deoxynucleoside 2′-dioxygenase
 : procollagen-lysine 5-dioxygenase
 EC 1.14.11.5: Now included with  thymine dioxygenase
 : thymine dioxygenase
 : procollagen-proline 3-dioxygenase
 : trimethyllysine dioxygenase
 : flavanone 3-dioxygenase
 : pyrimidine-deoxynucleoside 1′-dioxygenase
 : hyoscyamine (6S)-dioxygenase
 : gibberellin-44 dioxygenase
 : gibberellin 2β-dioxygenase
 EC 1.14.11.14: Now , 6β-hydroxyhyoscyamine epoxidase
 : gibberellin 3β-dioxygenase
 :  peptide-aspartate β-dioxygenase
 : taurine dioxygenase
 : phytanoyl-CoA dioxygenase
 EC 1.14.11.19: Now , anthocyanidin synthase
 : deacetoxyvindoline 4-hydroxylase
 : clavaminate synthase
 EC 1.14.11.22: Now , flavone synthase
 EC 1.14.11.23: Now , flavonol synthase
 : 2′-deoxymugineic-acid 2′-dioxygenase
 : mugineic-acid 3-dioxygenase
 : deacetoxycephalosporin-C hydroxylase
 : [histone H3]-dimethyl-L-lysine36 demethylase
 : proline 3-hydroxylase
 : hypoxia-inducible factor-proline dioxygenase
 : hypoxia-inducible factor-asparagine dioxygenase
 : thebaine 6-O-demethylase
 : codeine 3-O-demethylase
 : DNA oxidative demethylase
 EC 1.14.11.34: Now , 2-oxoglutarate/L-arginine monooxygenase/decarboxylase (succinate-forming)
 : 1-deoxypentalenic acid 11β-hydroxylase
 : pentalenolactone F synthase
 : pentalenolactone F synthase *
 : kanamycin B dioxygenase *
 : verruculogen synthase *
 : L-asparagine hydroxylase *
 : enduracididine β-hydroxylase *
 : L-arginine hydroxylase *
 : tRNAPhe (7-(3-amino-3-carboxypropyl)wyosine37-C2)-hydroxylase *
 : (S)-dichlorprop dioxygenase (2-oxoglutarate) *
 : (R)-dichlorprop dioxygenase (2-oxoglutarate) *
 : L-isoleucine 4-hydroxylase *
 : 2-aminoethylphosphonate dioxygenase *
 : [50S ribosomal protein L16]-arginine 3-hydroxylase *
 : xanthine dioxygenase *
 : uridine-5′-phosphate dioxygenase *
 EC|1.14.11.50: Now , (–)-deoxypodophyllotoxin synthase
 : DNA N 6-methyladenine demethylase *
 : validamycin A dioxygenase *
 : mRNA N 6-methyladenine demethylase *
 : mRNA N 1-methyladenine demethylase *
 : ectoine hydroxylase *
 : L-proline cis-4-hydroxylase *
 : L-proline trans-4-hydroxylase *
 : ornithine lipid ester-linked acyl 2-hydroxylase *
 : 2,4-dihydroxy-1,4-benzoxazin-3-one-glucoside dioxygenase *
 : scopoletin 8-hydroxylase *
 : feruloyl-CoA 6-hydroxylase *
 : trans-4-coumaroyl-CoA 2-hydroxylase *
 : peptidyl-lysine (3S)-dioxygenase *
 : glutarate dioxygenase *
 : [histone H3]-dimethyl-L-lysine9 demethylase *
 : [histone H3]-trimethylL-lysine9 demethylase *
 : [histone H3]-trimethyl-LL-lysine4 demethylase *
 : [histone H3]-trimethyl-L-lysine27 demethylase *
 : [histone H3]-trimethyl-L-lysine37 demethylase *
 : 7-deoxycylindrospermopsin hydroxylase *
 : methylphosphonate hydroxylase *
 : [2-(trimethylamino)ethyl]phosphonate dioxygenase *
 : [protein]-arginine 3-hydroxylase *
 : L-isoleucine 31-dioxygenase *
 : 31-hydroxy-L-isoleucine 4-dioxygenase *
 : L-glutamate 3(R)-hydroxylase *
 : alkyl sulfatase *

EC 1.14.12 With NADH or NADPH as one donor, and incorporation of two atoms of oxygen into one donor
 : anthranilate 1,2-dioxygenase (deaminating, decarboxylating)
 EC 1.14.12.2: Now  anthranilate 3-monooxygenase (deaminating)
 : benzene 1,2-dioxygenase
 EC 1.14.12.4: , 3-hydroxy-2-methylpyridinecarboxylate monooxygenase
 EC 1.14.12.5: Now , 5-pyridoxate monooxygenase
 EC 1.14.12.6: Now , 2-hydroxycyclohexanone 2-monooxygenase
 : phthalate 4,5-dioxygenase
 : 4-sulfobenzoate 3,4-dioxygenase
 : 4-chlorophenylacetate 3,4-dioxygenase
 : benzoate 1,2-dioxygenase
 : toluene dioxygenase
 : naphthalene 1,2-dioxygenase
 : 2-halobenzoate 1,2-dioxygenase
 : 2-aminobenzenesulfonate 2,3-dioxygenase
 : terephthalate 1,2-dioxygenase
 : 2-hydroxyquinoline 5,6-dioxygenase
 : nitric oxide dioxygenase
 : biphenyl 2,3-dioxygenase
 : 3-phenylpropionate dioxygenase
 EC 1.14.12.21: Now , benzoyl-CoA 2,3-epoxidase
 : carbazole 1,9a-dioxygenase
 : nitroarene dioxygenase *	 
 : 2,4-dinitrotoluene dioxygenase *	 
 : p-cumate 2,3-dioxygenase * 
 : chlorobenzene dioxygenase *
 *No Wikipedia article

EC 1.14.13 With NADH or NADPH as one donor, and incorporation of one atom of oxygen into the other donor
 : salicylate 1-monooxygenase
 : 4-hydroxybenzoate 3-monooxygenase
 EC 1.14.13.3: Now , 4-hydroxyphenylacetate 3-monooxygenase
 : melilotate 3-monooxygenase
 : imidazoleacetate 4-monooxygenase
 : orcinol 2-monooxygenase
 : phenol 2-monooxygenase
 : flavin-containing monooxygenase
 : kynurenine 3-monooxygenase
 : 2,6-dihydroxypyridine 3-monooxygenase
 EC 1.14.13.11:  Now , trans-cinnamate 4-monooxygenase
 EC 1.14.13.12: Now , benzoate 4-monooxygenase
 : trans-cinnamate 2-monooxygenase
 EC 1.14.13.15: Now , cholestanetriol 26-monooxygenase
 : cyclopentanone monooxygenase
 EC 1.14.13.17: Now , cholesterol 7α-monooxygenase
 : 4-hydroxyphenylacetate 1-monooxygenase
 : taxifolin 8-monooxygenase
 : 2,4-dichlorophenol 6-monooxygenase
 EC 1.14.13.21: Now , flavonoid 3′-monooxygenase
 : cyclohexanone monooxygenase
 : 3-hydroxybenzoate 4-monooxygenase
 : 3-hydroxybenzoate 6-monooxygenase
 : methane monooxygenase (soluble)
 : 4-aminobenzoate 1-monooxygenase
 EC 1.14.13.28: Now , 3,9-dihydroxypterocarpan 6a-monooxygenase
 : 4-nitrophenol 2-monooxygenase
 EC 1.14.13.30: Now , leukotriene-B4 20-monooxygenase
 : 2-nitrophenol 2-monooxygenase
 : albendazole monooxygenase
 : 4-hydroxybenzoate 3-monooxygenase (NAD(P)H)
 : leukotriene-E4 20-monooxygenase
 : anthranilate 3-monooxygenase (deaminating)
 EC 1.14.13.36: Now , 5-O-(4-coumaroyl)-D-quinate 3′-monooxygenase
 EC 1.14.13.37: Now , methyltetrahydroprotoberberine 14-monooxygenase
 : anhydrotetracycline monooxygenase
 : nitric-oxide synthase
 : anthraniloyl-CoA monooxygenase
 EC 1.14.13.41: Now , tyrosine N-monooxygenase
 : questin monooxygenase
 : 2-hydroxybiphenyl 3-monooxygenase
 EC 1.14.13.45: Now , CMP-N-acetylneuraminate monooxygenase
 : (-)-menthol monooxygenase
 EC 1.14.13.47: Now , (S)-limonene 3-monooxygenase
 : pentachlorophenol monooxygenase
 : 6-oxocineole dehydrogenase
 EC 1.14.13.52: Now , isoflavone 3′-hydroxylase
 EC 1.14.13.53:  Now , 4′-methoxyisoflavone 2′-hydroxylase
 : ketosteroid monooxygenase
 EC 1.14.13.55: Now , protopine 6-monooxygenase
 EC 1.14.13.56: Now , dihydrosanguinarine 10-monooxygenase
 EC 1.14.13.57: Now , dihydrochelirubine 12-monooxygenase
 : benzoyl-CoA 3-monooxygenase
 : L-lysine N 6-monooxygenase (NADPH)
 : 2-hydroxyquinoline 8-monooxygenase
 : 4-hydroxyquinoline 3-monooxygenase
 : 3-hydroxyphenylacetate 6-hydroxylase
 : 4-hydroxybenzoate 1-hydroxylase
 EC 1.14.13.65: deleted
 : 2-hydroxycyclohexanone 2-monooxygenase
 EC 1.14.13.67: Now , quinine 3-monooxygenase
 EC 1.14.13.68: Now , 4-hydroxyphenylacetaldehyde oxime monooxygenase
 : alkene monooxygenase
 EC 1.14.13.70: Now , sterol 14α-demethylase
 EC 1.14.13.71: Now , N-methylcoclaurine 3′-monooxygenase
 EC 1.14.13.73: Now , tabersonine 16-hydroxylase
 EC 1.14.13.74: Now , 7-deoxyloganin 7-hydroxylase
 EC 1.14.13.75: Now , vinorine hydroxylase
 EC 1.14.13.76: Now , taxane 10β-hydroxylase
 EC 1.14.13.77: Now , taxane 13α-hydroxylase
 EC 1.14.13.78: Now , ent-kaurene monooxygenase
 EC 1.14.13.79: Now , ent-kaurenoic acid oxidase
 : magnesium-protoporphyrin IX monomethyl ester (oxidative) cyclase
 : vanillate monooxygenase
 : precorrin-3B synthase
 : 4-hydroxyacetophenone monooxygenase
 EC 1.14.13.85: Now , glyceollin synthase
 EC 1.14.13.87: Now , licodione synthase]
 EC 1.14.13.88: Now , flavanoid 3,5-hydroxylase
 EC 1.14.13.89: Now , isoflavone 2-hydroxylase
 EC 1.14.13.90: Now , zeaxanthin epoxidase
 EC 1.14.13.91: Now , deoxysarpagine hydroxylase
 : phenylacetone monooxygenase
 EC 1.14.13.93: Now , (+)-abscisic acid 8-hydroxylase
 EC 1.14.13.94: Now , lithocholate 6β-hydroxylase
 EC 1.14.13.96:  Now , 5β-cholestane-3α,7α-diol 12α-hydroxylase
 EC 1.14.13.97:  Now , taurochenodeoxycholate 6α-hydroxylase
 EC 1.14.13.98: Now , cholesterol 24-hydroxylase
 EC 1.14.13.99: Now , 24-hydroxycholesterol 7α-hydroxylase
 : senecionine N-oxygenase
 EC 1.14.13.102: Now , psoralen synthase
 EC 1.14.13.103:  Now , 8-dimethylallylnaringenin 2-hydroxylase
 : Now , (+)-menthofuran synthase
 : monocyclic monoterpene ketone monooxygenase
 : limonene 1,2-monooxygenase
 EC 1.14.13.108: Now , abieta-7,13-diene hydroxylase
 EC 1.14.13.109: Now , abieta-7,13-dien-18-ol hydroxylase
 EC 1.14.13.110: Now , geranylgeraniol 18-hydroxylase
 : methanesulfonate monooxygenase
 EC 1.14.13.112: Now , 3-epi-6-deoxocathasterone 23-monooxygenase
 : FAD-dependent urate hydroxylase
 : 6-hydroxynicotinate 3-monooxygenase
 EC 1.14.13.115: Now , angelicin synthase
 : Now , geranylhydroquinone 3-hydroxylase
 EC 1.14.13.117: Now , isoleucine N-monooxygenase
 EC 1.14.13.118: Now , valine N-monooxygenase
 EC 1.14.13.119: Now , 5-epiaristolochene 1,3-dihydroxylase
 EC 1.14.13.120: Now , costunolide synthase
 EC 1.14.13.121: Now , premnaspirodiene oxygenase
 : chlorophyllide-a oxygenase
 EC 1.14.13.123: Now , germacrene A hydroxylase
 EC 1.14.13.125: Now , tryptophan N-monooxygenase
 EC 1.14.13.126: Now , vitamin D3 24-hydroxylase	 
 : 3-(3-hydroxyphenyl)propanoate hydroxylase
 : 7-methylxanthine demethylase
 EC 1.14.13.129: Now , β-carotene 3-hydroxylase
 : pyrrole-2-carboxylate monooxygenase
 : dimethyl-sulfide monooxygenase
 EC 1.14.13.132: Now , squalene monooxygenase
 EC 1.14.13.133: Now , pentalenene oxygenase
 EC 1.14.13.134: Now , β-amyrin 11-oxidase
 : 1-hydroxy-2-naphthoate hydroxylase
 EC 1.14.13.136: Now , 2-hydroxyisoflavanone synthase
 EC 1.14.13.137: Now , indole-2-monooxygenase
 EC 1.14.13.138: Now , indolin-2-one monooxygenase
 EC 1.14.13.139: Now , 3-hydroxyindolin-2-one monooxygenase
 EC 1.14.13.140: Now , 2-hydroxy-1,4-benzoxazin-3-one monooxygenase.
 EC 1.14.13.141: Now , cholest-4-en-3-one 26-monooxygenase [(25S)-3-oxocholest-4-en-26-oate forming]
 EC 1.14.13.142: Now , 3-ketosteroid 9α-monooxygenase
 EC 1.14.13.143: Now  ent-isokaurene C2/C3-hydroxylase
 EC 1.14.13.144: Now , 9β-pimara-7,15-diene oxidase
 EC 1.14.13.145: Now , ent-cassa-12,15-diene 11-hydroxylase
 : taxoid 14β-hydroxylase
 : taxoid 7β-hydroxylase
 : trimethylamine monooxygenase
 : phenylacetyl-CoA 1,2-epoxidase
 EC 1.14.13.150: Now , α-humulene 10-hydroxylase
 EC 1.14.13.151: Now , linalool 8-monooxygenase	 
 EC 1.14.13.152: Now , geraniol 8-hydroxylase
 : (+)-sabinene 3-hydroxylase
 : erythromycin 12-hydroxylase
 : α-pinene monooxygenase
 EC 1.14.13.156: Now , 1,8-cineole 2-endo-monooxygenase
 EC 1.14.13.157: Now , 1,8-cineole 2-exo-monooxygenase
 EC 1.14.13.158: Now , amorpha-4,11-diene 12-monooxygenase
 EC 1.14.13.159: Now , vitamin D 25-hydroxylase
 : (2,2,3-trimethyl-5-oxocyclopent-3-enyl)acetyl-CoA 1,5-monooxygenase
 : (+)-camphor 6-exo-hydroxylase
 EC 1.14.13.162: Now , 2,5-diketocamphane 1,2-monooxygenase
 : 6-hydroxy-3-succinoylpyridine 3-monooxygenase
 EC 1.14.13.164: withdrawn: see , carotenoid isomerooxygenase
 : 4-nitrocatechol 4-monooxygenase

 Most of the entries from here on have no Wikipedia articles

 : 4-nitrophenol 4-monooxygenase	 
 : indole-3-pyruvate monooxygenase	 
  EC 1.14.13.169:  Now , sphingolipid C4-monooxygenase	 
 : pentalenolactone D synthase	 
 : neopentalenolactone D synthase	 
 : salicylate 5-hydroxylase	 
 EC 1.14.13.173: Now , 11-oxo-β-amyrin 30-oxidase 
 EC 1.14.13.174: Now , averantin hydroxylase	 
 EC 1.14.13.175: Now , aflatoxin B synthase	 
 EC 1.14.13.176: Now , tryprostatin B 6-hydroxylase	 
 EC 1.14.13.177: Now , fumitremorgin C monooxygenase	 
 : methylxanthine N 1-demethylase	 
 : methylxanthine N 3-demethylase	 
 : aklavinone 12-hydroxylase	 
 : 13-deoxydaunorubicin hydroxylase	 
 : 2-heptyl-3-hydroxy-4(1H)-quinolone synthase	 
 EC 1.14.13.183: Now , dammarenediol 12-hydroxylase	 
 EC 1.14.13.184: Now , protopanaxadiol 6-hydroxylase	 
 EC 1.14.13.185: Now , pikromycin synthase	 
 EC 1.14.13.186: Now , 20-oxo-5-O-mycaminosyltylactone 23-monooxygenase	 
 : L-evernosamine nitrososynthase	 
 EC 1.14.13.188: Now , 6-deoxyerythronolide B hydroxylase	 
 : 5-methyl-1-naphthoate 3-hydroxylase	 
 EC 1.14.13.190: Now , ferruginol synthase	 
 EC 1.14.13.191: Now , ent-sandaracopimaradiene 3-hydroxylase	 
 EC 1.14.13.192: Now , oryzalexin E synthase	 
 EC 1.14.13.193: Now , oryzalexin D synthase	 
 EC 1.14.13.194: Now , phylloquinone ω-hydroxylase	 
 : L-ornithine N 5-monooxygenase (NADPH)	 
 : L-ornithine N 5-monooxygenase [NAD(P)H]	 
 EC 1.14.13.197: Now , dihydromonacolin L hydroxylase	 
 EC 1.14.13.198: Now , monacolin L hydroxylase	 
 EC 1.14.13.199: Now , docosahexaenoic acid ω-hydroxylase	 
 : tetracenomycin A2 monooxygenase-dioxygenase	 
 EC 1.14.13.201: Now , β-amyrin 28-monooxygenase	 
 EC 1.14.13.202: Now , methyl farnesoate epoxidase	 
 EC 1.14.13.203: Now , farnesoate epoxidase	 
 EC 1.14.13.204: Now , long-chain acyl-CoA ω-monooxygenase	 
 EC 1.14.13.205: Now , long-chain fatty acid ω-monooxygenase	 
 EC 1.14.13.206: Now , laurate 7-monooxygenase	 
 EC 1.14.13.207: Now , ipsdienol synthase	 
 : benzoyl-CoA 2,3-epoxidase	 
 : salicyloyl-CoA 5-hydroxylase	 
 : 4-methyl-5-nitrocatechol 5-monooxygenase	 
 : rifampicin monooxygenase	 
 : 1,3,7-trimethyluric acid 5-monooxygenase	 
 EC 1.14.13.213: Now , bursehernin 5-monooxygenase	 
 EC 1.14.13.214: Now , (–)-4′-demethyl-deoxypodophyllotoxin 4-hydroxylase	 
 : protoasukamycin 4-monooxygenase	 
 : asperlicin C monooxygenase	 
 : protodeoxyviolaceinate monooxygenase	 
 : 5-methylphenazine-1-carboxylate 1-monooxygenase	 
 : resorcinol 4-hydroxylase (NADPH)	 
 : resorcinol 4-hydroxylase (NADH)	 
 EC 1.14.13.221: Now , cholest-4-en-3-one 26-monooxygenase [(25R)-3-oxocholest-4-en-26-oate forming]	 
 : aurachin C monooxygenase/isomerase	 
 : 3-hydroxy-4-methylanthranilyl-[aryl-carrier protein] 5-monooxygenase	 
 : violacein synthase	 
 : F-actin monooxygenase	 
 : acetone monooxygenase (methyl acetate-forming)	 
 : propane 2-monooxygenase	 
 : jasmonic acid 12-hydroxylase	 
 : tert-butyl alcohol monooxygenase	 
 : butane monooxygenase (soluble)	 
 : tetracycline 11a-monooxygenase	 
 : 6-methylpretetramide 4-monooxygenase	 
 : 4-hydroxy-6-methylpretetramide 12a-monooxygenase	 
 : 5a,11a-dehydrotetracycline 5-monooxygenase	 
 : indole-3-acetate monooxygenase	 
 : toluene 4-monooxygenase	 
 : aliphatic glucosinolate S-oxygenase	 
 : dimethylamine monooxygenase	 
 : carnitine monooxygenase	 
 : 2-polyprenylphenol 6-hydroxylase	 
 : 5-pyridoxate monooxygenase	 
 : 3-hydroxy-2-methylpyridine-5-carboxylate monooxygenase	 
 : toluene 2-monooxygenase	 
 : phenol 2-monooxygenase (NADH)	 
 : assimilatory dimethylsulfide S-monooxygenase	 
 : 4β-methylsterol monooxygenase	 
 : stachydrine N-demethylase

EC 1.14.14 With reduced flavin or flavoprotein as one donor, and incorporation of one atom of oxygen
 : unspecific monooxygenase
 EC 1.14.14.2: Now included with  unspecific monooxygenase
 : alkanal monooxygenase (FMN-linked)
 : alkanesulfonate monooxygenase
 EC 1.14.14.6: Now , methanesulfonate monooxygenase
 : anthranilate 3-monooxygenase (FAD)
 : 4-hydroxyphenylacetate 3-monooxygenase
 : nitrilotriacetate monooxygenase
 : styrene monooxygenase
 : 3-hydroxy-9,10-secoandrosta-1,3,5(10)-triene-9,17-dione monooxygenase
 :  4-(γ-L-glutamylamino)butanoyl-[BtrI acyl-carrier protein] monooxygenase

 Most of the entries from here on have no Wikipedia articles 

 : aromatase	 
 : (3S)-3-amino-3-(3-chloro-4-hydroxyphenyl)propanoyl-[peptidyl-carrier protein SgcC2] monooxygenase	 
 : steroid 21-monooxygenase	 
 : squalene monooxygenase	 
 : heme oxygenase (biliverdin-producing)	 
 : steroid 17α-monooxygenase	 
 : phenol 2-monooxygenase (FADH2)	 
 : dibenzothiophene monooxygenase	 
 : dibenzothiophene sulfone monooxygenase	 
 : cholesterol 7α-monooxygenase	 
 : vitamin D 25-hydroxylase	 
 : cholesterol 24-hydroxylase	 
 : 24-hydroxycholesterol 7α-hydroxylase	 
 : resorcinol 4-hydroxylase (FADH2)		 
 : long-chain alkane monooxygenase	 
 : 25/26-hydroxycholesterol 7α-hydroxylase	 
 : isobutylamine N-monooxygenase	 
 : ipsdienol synthase	 
 : 17α-hydroxyprogesterone deacetylase	 
 : ethylenediaminetetraacetate monooxygenase	 
 : methanesulfonate monooxygenase (FMNH2)	 
 : dimethylsulfone monooxygenase	 
 : tyrosine N-monooxygenase	 
 : 4-hydroxyphenylacetaldehyde oxime monooxygenase	 
 : valine N-monooxygenase	 
 : isoleucine N-monooxygenase	 
 : phenylalanine N-monooxygenase	 
 : (E)-2-methylbutanal oxime monooxygenase	 
 : homomethionine N-monooxygenase	 
 : (methylsulfanyl)alkanaldoxime N-monooxygenase	 
 : phenylacetaldehyde oxime monooxygenase	 
 : aromatic aldoxime N-monooxygenase	 
 : pimeloyl-[acyl-carrier protein] synthase	 
 : nitric-oxide synthase (flavodoxin)	 
 : jasmonoyl-L-amino acid 12-hydroxylase	 
 : 12-hydroxyjasmonoyl-L-amino acid 12-hydroxylase	 
 : tabersonine 3-oxygenase	 
 : (S)-limonene 6-monooxygenase	 
 : (S)-limonene 7-monooxygenase	 
 : (R)-limonene 6-monooxygenase	 
 : phenylacetate 2-hydroxylase	 
 : quinine 3-monooxygenase	 
 : 1,8-cineole 2-exo-monooxygenase	 
 : taurochenodeoxycholate 6α-hydroxylase	 
 : trimethyltridecatetraene synthase	 
 : dimethylnonatriene synthase	 
 : ferruginol monooxygenase	 
 : carnosic acid synthase	 
 : salviol synthase	 
 : β-amyrin 16β-monooxygenase	 
 : β-amyrin 6β-monooxygenase	 
 : sugiol synthase	 
 : marmesin synthase	 
 : 11-hydroxysugiol 20-monooxygenase	 
 : syn-pimaradiene 3-monooxygenase	 
 : ent-cassadiene hydroxylase	 
 : ent-sandaracopimaradiene 3-hydroxylase	 
 : cucurbitadienol 11-hydroxylase	 
 : drimenol monooxygenase	 
 : albendazole monooxygenase (sulfoxide-forming)	 
 : albendazole monooxygenase (hydroxylating)	 
 : fenbendazole monooxygenase (4′-hydroxylating)	 
 : ent-isokaurene C2/C3-hydroxylase	 
 : phenylacetonitrile α-monooxygenase	 
 : phylloquinone ω-hydroxylase	 
 : docosahexaenoic acid ω-hydroxylase	 
 : long-chain fatty acid ω-monooxygenase	 
 : flavanoid 3′,5′-hydroxylase	 
 : flavonoid 3′-monooxygenase	 
 : geraniol 8-hydroxylase	 
 : linalool 8-monooxygenase	 
 : 7-deoxyloganate 7-hydroxylase	 
 : ent-kaurene monooxygenase	 
 : 2-hydroxyisoflavanone synthase	 
 : isoflavone 3′-hydroxylase	 
 : 4′-methoxyisoflavone 2′-hydroxylase	 
 : isoflavone 2′-hydroxylase	 
 : trans-cinnamate 4-monooxygenase	 
 : benzoate 4-monooxygenase	 
 : 3,9-dihydroxypterocarpan 6a-monooxygenase	 
 : leukotriene-B4 20-monooxygenase	 
 : germacrene A hydroxylase	 
 : 5-O-(4-coumaroyl)-D-quinate 3′-monooxygenase	 
 : methyltetrahydroprotoberberine 14-monooxygenase	 
 : protopine 6-monooxygenase	 
 : (S)-limonene 3-monooxygenase	 
 : dihydrosanguinarine 10-monooxygenase	 
 : dihydrochelirubine 12-monooxygenase	 
 : N-methylcoclaurine 3′-monooxygenase	 
 : tabersonine 16-hydroxylase	 
 : vinorine hydroxylase	 
 : taxane 10β-hydroxylase	 
 : taxane 13α-hydroxylase	 
 : ent-kaurenoic acid monooxygenase	 
 : 2,5-diketocamphane 1,2-monooxygenase	 
 : 3-hydroxyindolin-2-one monooxygenase	 
 : 2-hydroxy-1,4-benzoxazin-3-one monooxygenase	 
 : 9β-pimara-7,15-diene oxidase	 
 : ent-cassa-12,15-diene 11-hydroxylase	 
 : α-humulene 10-hydroxylase	 
 : amorpha-4,11-diene 12-monooxygenase	 
 : 11-oxo-β-amyrin 30-oxidase	 
 : averantin hydroxylase	 
 : aflatoxin B synthase	 
 : tryprostatin B 6-hydroxylase	 
 : fumitremorgin C monooxygenase	 
 : dammarenediol 12-hydroxylase	 
 : protopanaxadiol 6-hydroxylase	 
 : oryzalexin E synthase	 
 : oryzalexin D synthase	 
 : dihydromonacolin L hydroxylase	 
 : monacolin L hydroxylase	 
 : β-amyrin 28-monooxygenase	 
 : methyl farnesoate epoxidase	 
 : farnesoate epoxidase	 
 : long-chain acyl-CoA ω-monooxygenase	 
 : laurate 7-monooxygenase	 
 : bursehernin 5′-monooxygenase	 
 : (–)-4′-demethyl-deoxypodophyllotoxin 4-hydroxylase	 
 : 1,8-cineole 2-endo-monooxygenase	 
 : β-amyrin 24-hydroxylase	 
 : glyceollin synthase	 
 : deoxysarpagine hydroxylase	 
 : (+)-abscisic acid 8′-hydroxylase	 
 : lithocholate 6β-hydroxylase	 
 : 5β-cholestane-3α,7α-diol 12α-hydroxylase	 
 : psoralen synthase	 
 : 8-dimethylallylnaringenin 2′-hydroxylase	 
 : (+)-menthofuran synthase	 
 : abieta-7,13-diene hydroxylase	 
 : abieta-7,13-dien-18-ol hydroxylase	 
 : geranylgeraniol 18-hydroxylase	 
 : 3-epi-6-deoxocathasterone 23-monooxygenase	 
 : angelicin synthase	 
 : 5-epiaristolochene 1,3-dihydroxylase	 
 : costunolide synthase	 
 : premnaspirodiene oxygenase	 
 : β-amyrin 11-oxidase	 
 : indole-2-monooxygenase	 
 : sterol 14α-demethylase	 
 : 3,6-diketocamphane 1,2-monooxygenase	 
 : tryptophan N-monooxygenase	 
 : indolin-2-one monooxygenase	 
 : carotenoid ε hydroxylase	 
 : dolabradiene monooxygenase	 
 : zealexin A1 synthase	 
 : nepetalactol monooxygenase	 
 : flavanone 2-hydroxylase	 
 : (S)-1-hydroxy-N-methylcanadine 13-hydroxylase	 
 : fraxetin 5-hydroxylase	 
 : indole-3-carbonyl nitrile 4-hydroxylase	 
 : (S)-N-methylcanadine 1-hydroxylase	 
 : (13S,14R)-13-O-acetyl-1-hydroxy-N-methylcanadine 8-hydroxylase	 
 : germacrene A acid 8β-hydroxylase	 
 : eupatolide synthase	 
 : 8-epi-inunolide synthase	 
 : β-amyrin 16α-hydroxylase	 
 : 3,5,6-trichloropyridin-2-ol monooxygenase	 
 : 2,4,6-trichlorophenol monooxygenase	 
 : geranylhydroquinone 3′′-hydroxylase	 
 : ferruginol synthase	 
 : taxadiene 5α-hydroxylase	 
 : ultra-long-chain fatty acid ω-hydroxylase

EC 1.14.15 With reduced iron–sulfur protein as one donor, and incorporation of one atom of oxygen
 : camphor 5-monooxygenase
 EC 1.14.15.2: Now , 2,5-diketocamphane 1,2-monooxygenase.
 : alkane 1-monooxygenase
 : steroid 11β-monooxygenase
 : corticosterone 18-monooxygenase
 : cholesterol monooxygenase (side-chain-cleaving)
 : choline monooxygenase
 : steroid 15β-monooxygenase
 : spheroidene monooxygenase
 : (+)-camphor 6-endo-hydroxylase
 : pentalenic acid synthase
 EC 1.14.15.12	: pimeloyl-[acyl-carrier protein] synthase. Now , pimeloyl-[acyl-carrier protein] synthase	 

 Most entries from here on have no Wikipedia articles

 : pulcherriminic acid synthase	 
 :  methyl-branched lipid ω-hydroxylase	 
 :  cholestanetriol 26-monooxygenase	 
 :  vitamin D3 24-hydroxylase	 
 :  pheophorbide a oxygenase	 
 :  calcidiol 1-monooxygenase	 
 :  C-19 steroid 1α-hydroxylase	 
 :  heme oxygenase (biliverdin-producing, ferredoxin)	 
 :  zeaxanthin epoxidase	 
 :  vitamin D 1,25-hydroxylase	 
 :  chloroacetanilide N-alkylformylase	 
 :  β-carotene 3-hydroxylase	 
 :  p-cymene methyl-monooxygenase	 
 :  toluene methyl-monooxygenase	 
 :  β-dihydromenaquinone-9 ω-hydroxylase	 
 :  cholest-4-en-3-one 26-monooxygenase [(25R)-3-oxocholest-4-en-26-oate forming]	 
 :  cholest-4-en-3-one 26-monooxygenase [(25S)-3-oxocholest-4-en-26-oate forming]	 
 :  3-ketosteroid 9α-monooxygenase	 
 :  2-hydroxy-5-methyl-1-naphthoate 7-hydroxylase	 
 :  pentalenene oxygenase	 
 :  pikromycin synthase	 
 :  20-oxo-5-O-mycaminosyltylactone 23-monooxygenase	 
 :  6-deoxyerythronolide B hydroxylase	 
 :  sterol 14α-demethylase (ferredoxin)	 
 :  luteothin monooxygenase	 
 :  N,N-dimethyl phenylurea N-demethylase	 
 :  epi-isozizaene 5-monooxygenase

EC 1.14.16 With reduced pteridine as one donor, and incorporation of one atom of oxygen into the other donor
 : phenylalanine 4-monooxygenase
 : tyrosine 3-monooxygenase
 EC 1.14.16.3: withdrawn owing to insufficient evidence (anthranilate 3-monooxygenase)
 : tryptophan 5-monooxygenase
 : alkylglycerol monooxygenase
 : mandelate 4-monooxygenase
 : phenylalanine 3-monooxygenase

EC 1.14.17 With reduced ascorbate as one donor, and incorporation of one atom of oxygen into the other donor
 : dopamine β-monooxygenase
 EC |1.14.17.2: deleted, now included with  monophenol monooxygenase
 : peptidylglycine monooxygenase
 : aminocyclopropanecarboxylate oxidase

EC 1.14.18 With another compound as one donor, and incorporation of one atom of oxygen into the other donor
 :  tyrosinase
 : CMP-N-acetylneuraminate monooxygenase
 : methane monooxygenase (particulate)
 : phosphatidylcholine 12-monooxygenase *
 : sphingolipid C4-monooxygenase *
 : 4-hydroxysphinganine ceramide fatty acyl 2-hydroxylase *
 : dihydroceramide fatty acyl 2-hydroxylase *
 : 4α-methylsterol monooxygenase *
 : plant 4,4-dimethylsterol C-4α-methyl-monooxygenase *
 : plant 4α-monomethylsterol monooxygenase *
 : 2-hydroxy fatty acid dioxygenase *
 *No Wikipedia article

EC 1.14.19 With oxidation of a pair of donors resulting in the reduction of O2 to two molecules of water
 : stearoyl-CoA 9-desaturase
 :  stearoyl-[acyl-carrier-protein] 9-desaturase
 : linoleoyl-CoA desaturase
 :  acyl-lipid (11-3)-desaturase
 : acyl-CoA 11-(Z)-desaturase
 : acyl-CoA (9+3)-desaturase
 EC 1.14.19.7: Now , (S)-2-hydroxypropylphosphonic acid epoxidase
 Most of the entries from here on have no Wikipedia articles
 : pentalenolactone synthase	 
 : tryptophan 7-halogenase	 
 : icosanoyl-CoA 5-desaturase	 
 : acyl-[acyl-carrier-protein] 4-desaturase	 
 : acyl-lipid ω-(9-4) desaturase	 
 : acyl-CoA 15-desaturase	 
 : linoleoyl-lipid Δ9 conjugase	 
 : (11Z)-hexadec-11-enoyl-CoA conjugase	 
 : linoleoyl-lipid Δ12 conjugase (11E,13Z-forming)	 
 : sphingolipid 4-desaturase	 
 : sphingolipid 8-(E)-desaturase	 
 : sphingolipid 10-desaturase	 
 : Δ7-sterol 5(6)-desaturase	 
 : cholesterol 7-desaturase	 
 : acyl-lipid ω-6 desaturase (cytochrome b5)	 
 : acyl-lipid (n+3)-(Z)-desaturase (ferredoxin)	 
 : acyl-CoA 11-(E)-desaturase	 
 : acyl-lipid ω-3 desaturase (cytochrome b5)	 
 : acyl-[acyl-carrier-protein] 6-desaturase	 
 : sn-2 palmitoyl-lipid 9-desaturase	 
 : sn-1 stearoyl-lipid 9-desaturase	 
 : sphingolipid 8-(E/Z)-desaturase	 
 : acyl-lipid (8-3)-desaturase	 
 : acyl-lipid (7-3)-desaturase	 
 : palmitoyl-CoA 14-(E/Z)-desaturase	 
 : Δ12 acyl-lipid conjugase (11E,13E-forming)	 
 : acyl-lipid (9+3)-(E)-desaturase	 
 : sn-2 acyl-lipid ω-3 desaturase (ferredoxin)	 
 : sn-1 acyl-lipid ω-3 desaturase (ferredoxin)	 
 : acyl-CoA 5-desaturase	 
 : acyl-lipid Δ6-acetylenase	 
 : acyl-lipid Δ12-acetylenase	 
 : hex-5-enoyl-[acyl-carrier protein] acetylenase	 
 : sterol 22-desaturase	 
 : palmitoyl-[glycerolipid] 7-desaturase	 
 : palmitoyl-[glycerolipid] 3-(E)-desaturase	 
 : acyl-CoA (8-3)-desaturase	 
 : sn-1 oleoyl-lipid 12-desaturase	 
 : sn-1 linoleoyl-lipid 6-desaturase	 
 : acyl-lipid (9-3)-desaturase	 
 : tert-amyl alcohol desaturase	 
 : tetracycline 7-halogenase	 
 : noroxomaritidine synthase	 
 : (S)-corytuberine synthase	 
 : camalexin synthase	 
 : all-trans-retinol 3,4-desaturase	 
 : 1,2-dehydroreticuline synthase	 
 : 4-hydroxybenzoate brominase (decarboxylating)	 
 : 1H-pyrrole-2-carbonyl-[peptidyl-carrier protein] chlorinase	 
 : 1H-pyrrole-2-carbonyl-[peptidyl-carrier protein] brominase	 
 : tryptophan 5-halogenase	 
 : tryptophan 6-halogenase	 
 : 7-chloro-L-tryptophan 6-halogenase	 
 : dihydrorhizobitoxine desaturase	 
 : secologanin synthase	 
 : pseudobaptigenin synthase	 
 : (S)-stylopine synthase	 
 : (S)-cheilanthifoline synthase	 
 : berbamunine synthase	 
 : salutaridine synthase	 
 : (S)-canadine synthase	 
 : biflaviolin synthase	 
 : mycocyclosin synthase	 
 : fumitremorgin C synthase	 
 : (–)-pluviatolide synthase	 
 : (S)-nandinine synthase	 
 : (+)-piperitol/(+)-sesamin synthase	 
 : very-long-chain acyl-lipid ω-9 desaturase	 
 : flavone synthase II	 
 : plasmanylethanolamine desaturase	 
 : decanoyl-[acyl-carrier protein] acetylenase

EC 1.14.20 With 2-oxoglutarate as one donor, and the other dehydrogenated
 : deacetoxycephalosporin-C synthase
 EC 1.14.20.2: Now , 2,4-dihydroxy-1,4-benzoxazin-3-one-glucoside dioxygenase
 : (5R)-carbapenem-3-carboxylate synthase *
 : anthocyanidin synthase *
 : flavone synthase I *
 : flavonol synthase *
 : 2-oxoglutarate/L-arginine monooxygenase/decarboxylase (succinate-forming) *
 : (–)-deoxypodophyllotoxin synthase *
 : L-tyrosine isonitrile desaturase *
 : L-tyrosine isonitrile desaturase/decarboxylase *
 : 3-[(Z)-2-isocyanoethenyl]-1H-indole synthase *
 : 3-[(E)-2-isocyanoethenyl]-1H-indole synthase *
 : 6β-hydroxyhyoscyamine epoxidase *
 : hapalindole-type alkaloid chlorinase *
 : L-threonyl-[L-threonyl-carrier protein] 4-chlorinase *
 *No Wikipedia article

EC 1.14.21 With NADH or NADPH as one donor, and the other dehydrogenated
  EC 1.14.21.1: Now , (S)-stylopine synthase
  EC 1.14.21.2: Now , (S)-cheilanthifoline synthase
  EC 1.14.21.3: Now , berbamunine synthase
  EC 1.14.21.4: Now , salutaridine synthase
  EC 1.14.21.5: Now , (S)-canadine synthase	 
  EC 1.14.21.6: Now , Δ7-sterol 5(6)-desaturase
  EC 1.14.21.7: Now , biflaviolin synthase
  EC 1.14.21.8: Now , pseudobaptigenin synthase
 EC 1.14.21.9: Now , mycocyclosin synthase *	 
 EC 1.14.21.10: Now , fumitremorgin C synthase * 
 EC 1.14.21.11: Now , (–)-pluviatolide synthase *
 EC 1.14.21.12: Now , (S)-nandinine synthase *
 *No Wikipedia article

EC 1.14.99 Miscellaneous
 : prostaglandin-endoperoxide synthase
 : kynurenine 7,8-hydroxylase
 EC 1.14.99.3: Now , heme oxygenase (biliverdin-producing)
 : progesterone monooxygenase
 EC 1.14.99.5: Now , stearoyl-CoA 9-desaturase
 EC 1.14.99.6:  Now , acyl-[acyl-carrier-protein] desaturase	 
 EC 1.14.99.8: Now included with  unspecific monooxygenase
 EC 1.14.99.10: Now , steroid 21-monooxygenase
 : estradiol 6β-monooxygenase
 : 4-androstene-3,17-dione monooxygenase
 EC 1.14.99.13: Now , 3-hydroxybenzoate 4-monooxygenase
 : progesterone 11α-monooxygenase
 : 4-methoxybenzoate monooxygenase (O-demethylating)
 EC 1.14.99.16: Now , methylsterol monooxygenase
 EC 1.14.99.17: Now , glyceryl-ether monooxygenase
 EC 1.14.99.18: deleted
 : phylloquinone monooxygenase (2,3-epoxidizing)
 : Latia-luciferin monooxygenase (demethylating)
 : ecdysone 20-monooxygenase
 : 3-hydroxybenzoate 2-monooxygenase
 : steroid 9α-monooxygenase
 : Now , linoleoyl-CoA desaturase
 : 2-hydroxypyridine 5-monooxygenase
 EC 1.14.99.28: Now , linalool 8-monooxygenase
 : deoxyhypusine monooxygenase
 EC 1.14.99.30: Now , 9,9′-dicis-ζ-carotene desaturase.
 EC 1.14.99.33: Now , acyl-lipid Δ12-acetylenase
 : monoprenyl isoflavone epoxidase
 : thiophene-2-carbonyl-CoA monooxygenase
 EC 1.14.99.37: Now , taxadiene 5α-hydroxylase
 : cholesterol 25-hydroxylase
 : ammonia monooxygenase
 EC 1.14.99.40: Now , 5,6-dimethylbenzimidazole synthase
 EC 1.14.99.41: Now , all-trans-8′-apo-β-carotenal 15,15′-oxygenase
 EC 1.14.99.42: Now , crocetin dialdehyde synthase
 EC 1.14.99.43: Now , β-amyrin 24-hydroxylase
 : diapolycopene oxygenase
 EC 1.14.99.45: Now , carotene ε-monooxygenase
 : pyrimidine oxygenase
 : (+)-larreatricin hydroxylase
 Most of the entries from here on have no Wikipedia article
 : heme oxygenase (staphylobilin-producing)	 
 EC 1.14.99.49: Now , 2-hydroxy-5-methyl-1-naphthoate 7-hydroxylase	 
 : γ-glutamyl hercynylcysteine S-oxide synthase	 
 : hercynylcysteine S-oxide synthase	 
 : L-cysteinyl-L-histidinylsulfoxide synthase	 
 : lytic chitin monooxygenase	 
 : lytic cellulose monooxygenase (C1-hydroxylating)	 
 : lytic starch monooxygenase	 
 : lytic cellulose monooxygenase (C4-dehydrogenating)	 
 : heme oxygenase (mycobilin-producing)	 
 : heme oxygenase (biliverdin-IX-β and δ-forming)	 
 : tryptamine 4-monooxygenase	 
 : 3-demethoxyubiquinol 3-hydroxylase	 
 : cyclooctat-9-en-7-ol 5-monooxygenase	 
 : cyclooctatin synthase	 
 : β-carotene 4-ketolase	 
 : zeaxanthin 4-ketolase	 
 : 4-amino-L-phenylalanyl-[CmlP-peptidyl-carrier-protein] 3-hydroxylase	 
 : [histone H3]-N 6,N 6-dimethyl-L-lysine4 FAD-dependent demethylase	 
 : α-N-dichloroacetyl-p-aminophenylserinol N-oxygenase	 
 : 4-aminobenzoate N-oxygenase	 
 : tRNA 2-(methylsulfanyl)-N 6-isopentenyladenosine37 hydroxylase

EC 1.15 Acting on superoxide as acceptor
EC 1.15.1
 : superoxide dismutase
 : superoxide reductase

EC 1.16 Oxidizing metal ions
EC 1.16.1 With NAD+ or NADP+ as acceptor
 : mercury(II) reductase
 : diferric-transferrin reductase
 EC 1.16.1.3: deleted since no specific enzyme catalysing this activity has been identified
 : cob(II)alamin reductase
 EC 1.16.1.5: deleted since the enzyme the entry was based on was later shown to be , pyruvate dehydrogenase (NADP+).
 : cyanocobalamin reductase (cyanide-eliminating)
 : ferric-chelate reductase
 :   [methionine synthase] reductase
 : ferric-chelate reductase (NADPH)
 : ferric-chelate reductase [NAD(P)H] *
 *No Wikipedia article

EC 1.16.3 With oxygen as acceptor
 : ferroxidase
 :	bacterial non-heme ferritin	*
 :	manganese oxidase *
 *No Wikipedia article

EC 1.16.5 With a quinone or similar compound as acceptor
 EC 1.16.5.1: Now , ascorbate ferrireductase (transmembrane)

EC 1.16.8 With a flavin as acceptor

EC 1.16.9 With a copper protein as acceptor
 : iron:rusticyanin reductase

EC 1.16.98 With other, known, physiological acceptors
 EC 1.16.98.1: Now  iron:rusticyanin reductase

EC 1.16.99 With unknown physiological acceptors
 : [Co(II) methylated amine-specific corrinoid protein] reductase

EC 1.17 Acting on CH or CH2 groups
EC 1.17.1 With NAD or NADP as acceptor
 : CDP-4-dehydro-6-deoxyglucose reductase
 : leucoanthocyanidin reductase
 : xanthine dehydrogenase
 : nicotinate dehydrogenase
 EC 1.17.1.6: Now , bile-acid 7α-dehydroxylase. It is now known that FAD is the acceptor and not NAD+ as was thought previously
 EC 1.17.1.7:  Now , 3-oxo-5,6-dehydrosuberyl-CoA semialdehyde dehydrogenase
 : 4-hydroxy-tetrahydrodipicolinate reductase *
 : formate dehydrogenase *
 : formate dehydrogenase (NADP+) *
 : formate dehydrogenase (NAD+, ferredoxin) *
 *No Wikipedia article

EC 1.17.2 With a cytochrome as acceptor
 : nicotinate dehydrogenase (cytochrome)
 : lupanine 17-hydroxylase (cytochrome c)
 : formate dehydrogenase (cytochrome-c-553) *
 *No Wikipedia article

EC 1.17.3 With oxygen as acceptor
 : pteridine oxidase
 : xanthine oxidase
 : 6-hydroxynicotinate dehydrogenase
 : juglone 3-hydroxylase *
 *No Wikipedia article

EC 1.17.4 With a disulfide as acceptor
 : ribonucleoside-diphosphate reductase
 : ribonucleoside-triphosphate reductase (thioredoxin)
 : vitamin-K-epoxide reductase (warfarin-sensitive) *
 : vitamin-K-epoxide reductase (warfarin-insensitive) *
 *No Wikipedia article

EC 1.17.5 With a quinone or similar compound as acceptor
 : phenylacetyl-CoA dehydrogenase
 : caffeine dehydrogenase
 : formate dehydrogenase-N *
 *No Wikipedia article

EC 1.17.7 With an iron–sulfur protein as acceptor
 : (E)-4-hydroxy-3-methylbut-2-enyl-diphosphate synthase (ferredoxin)
 : 7-hydroxymethyl chlorophyll a reductase
 : (E)-4-hydroxy-3-methylbut-2-enyl-diphosphate synthase (flavodoxin) *
 : 4-hydroxy-3-methylbut-2-en-1-yl diphosphate reductase *
 *No Wikipedia article

EC 1.17.98 With other, known, physiological acceptors	 
 EC 1.17.98.1: bile-acid 7α-dehydroxylase. Now known to be catalyzed by multiple enzymes.	 
 : bacteriochlorophyllide c C-71-hydroxylase *	 
 : formate dehydrogenase (coenzyme F420) *
 : formate dehydrogenase (hydrogenase) *
 *No Wikipedia article

EC 1.17.99 With unknown physiological acceptors
 No Wikipedia article for any of these
 EC 1.17.99.1:  Now EC 1.17.9.1, 4-methylphenol dehydrogenase (hydroxylating)	 
 : ethylbenzene hydroxylase	 
 : 3α,7α,12α-trihydroxy-5β-cholestanoyl-CoA 24-hydroxylase	 
 : uracil/thymine dehydrogenase	 
 EC 1.17.99.5: Now classified as EC 1.17.98.1, bile-acid 7α-dehydroxylase
 : epoxyqueuosine reductase	 
 EC 1.17.99.7: Now classified as EC 1.17.98.4, formate dehydrogenase (hydrogenase) 
 : limonene dehydrogenase	 
 : heme a'' synthase	 
 : steroid C-25 hydroxylase	 
 : 3-oxo-Δ1-steroid hydratase/dehydrogenase

EC 1.18 Acting on iron–sulfur proteins as donors

EC 1.18.1 With NAD+ or NADP+ as acceptor
 : rubredoxin—NAD+ reductase
 : ferredoxin—NADP+ reductase
 : ferredoxin—NAD+ reductase
 : rubredoxin—NAD(P)+ reductase
 : Putidaredoxin—NAD+ reductase
 : adrenodoxin-NADP+ reductase
 : ferredoxin—NAD(P)+ reductase (naphthalene dioxygenase ferredoxin-specific)	 
 EC 1.18.1.8: Now , ferredoxin—NAD+ oxidoreductase (Na+-transporting)

EC 1.18.2 With dinitrogen as acceptor (deleted sub-subclass)
 EC 1.18.2.1: now , nitrogenase

EC 1.18.3 With H+ as acceptor (deleted sub-subclass)
 EC 1.18.3.1: Now , ferredoxin hydrogenase

EC 1.18.6 With dinitrogen as acceptor
 : nitrogenase
 : vanadium-dependent nitrogenase *
 *No Wikipedia article

EC 1.18.96 With other, known, acceptors (deleted sub-subclass)
 EC 1.18.96.1: Now , superoxide reductase

EC 1.18.99 With H+ as acceptor (deleted sub-subclass)
 EC 1.18.99.1: Now , ferredoxin hydrogenase

EC 1.19 Acting on reduced flavodoxin as donor

EC 1.19.1 With NAD+ or NADP+ as acceptor
 :	flavodoxin—NADP+ reductase

EC 1.19.6 With dinitrogen as acceptor
 : nitrogenase (flavodoxin)

EC 1.20 Acting on phosphorus or arsenic in donors

EC 1.20.1 Acting on phosphorus or arsenic in donors, with NAD+ as acceptor
 : phosphonate dehydrogenase

EC 1.20.2 Acting on phosphorus or arsenic in donors, with NAD(P)+ as acceptor
 : arsenate reductase (cytochrome c)

EC 1.20.4 Acting on phosphorus or arsenic in donors, with disulfide as acceptor
 : arsenate reductase (glutaredoxin)
 : methylarsonate reductase
 : mycoredoxin
 : arsenate reductase (thioredoxin) *
 *No Wikipedia article

EC 1.20.9 With a copper protein as acceptor
 : arsenate reductase (azurin)

EC 1.20.98 With other, known acceptors
 EC 1.20.98.1: Now , arsenate reductase (azurin)

EC 1.20.99 With unknown physiological acceptors
 : arsenate reductase (donor)

EC 1.21 Catalysing the reaction X-H + Y-H = X-Y

EC 1.21.3 With oxygen as acceptor
 : isopenicillin-N synthase
 : columbamine oxidase
 : reticuline oxidase
 : sulochrin oxidase ((+)-bisdechlorogeodin-forming)
 : sulochrin oxidase ((-)-bisdechlorogeodin-forming)
 : aureusidin synthase
 : tetrahydrocannabinolic acid synthase
 : cannabidiolic acid synthase

EC 1.21.4 With a disulfide as acceptor
 : D-proline reductase (dithiol)
 : glycine reductase
 : sarcosine reductase
 : betaine reductase
 : tetrachlorohydroquinone reductive dehalogenase *
 *No Wikipedia article

EC 1.21.98 With other, known, physiological acceptors	 
 : cyclic dehypoxanthinyl futalosine synthase	*
 : dichlorochromopyrrolate synthase *
 : anaerobic magnesium-protoporphyrin IX monomethyl ester cyclase *
 : PqqA peptide cyclase *
 *No Wikipedia article

EC 1.21.99 With unknown physiological acceptors

 :	β-cyclopiazonate dehydrogenase
 :  thyroxine 5-deiodinase *	 
 :  thyroxine 5′-deiodinase *	 
 :  tetrachloroethene reductive dehalogenase *
 *No Wikipedia article

EC 1.22 Acting on halogen in donors

EC 1.22.1 With NAD+ or NADP+ as acceptor
 EC 1.22.1.1: Now , iodotyrosine deiodinase

EC 1.23 Reducing C-O-C group as acceptor

EC 1.23.1 With NADH or NADPH as donor
 : (+)-pinoresinol reductase * 
 : (+)-lariciresinol reductase *
 : (–)-pinoresinol reductase *
 : (–)-lariciresinol reductase *
 *No Wikipedia article

EC 1.97 Other oxidoreductases

EC 1.97.1 Sole sub-subclass for oxidoreductases that do not belong in the other subclasses
 : chlorate reductase
 : pyrogallol hydroxytransferase
 EC 1.97.1.3:  Now , sulfhydrogenase, since hydrogen is known to be the electron donor
 : [formate-C-acetyltransferase]-activating enzyme
 EC 1.97.1.5: Now , arsenate reductase (glutaredoxin
 EC 1.97.1.6: Now , arsenate reductase (donor)	 
 EC 1.97.1.7: Now , methylarsonate reductase
 EC 1.97.1.8: Now , tetrachloroethene reductive dehalogenase
 : selenate reductase
 EC 1.97.1.10: Now  thyroxine 5′-deiodinase
 EC 1.97.1.11: Now  thyroxine 5-deiodinase.
 : photosystem I

EC 1.98 Enzymes using H2 as reductant (deleted subclass)
EC 1.98.1.1: Now , ferredoxin hydrogenase

EC 1.99 Other enzymes using O2 as oxidant

EC 1.99.1 Hydroxylases (now covered by EC 1.14)
 EC 1.99.1.1: deleted, Now , ferredoxin hydrogenase
 EC 1.99.1.2: deleted, Now , phenylalanine 4-monooxygenase
 EC 1.99.1.3: deleted, nicotinate 6-hydroxylase
 EC 1.99.1.4: deleted, tryptophan 5-hydroxylase
 EC 1.99.1.5: deleted, Now , kynurenine 3-monooxygenase
 EC 1.99.1.6: deleted, steroid 11α-hydroxylase
 EC 1.99.1.7: deleted, Now , steroid 11β-monooxygenase
 EC 1.99.1.8: deleted, steroid 6β-hydroxylase
 EC 1.99.1.9: deleted, Now , steroid 17α-monooxygenase
 EC 1.99.1.10: deleted, steroid 19-hydroxylase
 EC 1.99.1.11: deleted, Now , steroid 21-monooxygenase
 EC 1.99.1.12: deleted, alkoxyaryl hydroxylase
 EC 1.99.1.14: deleted, Now , 4-hydroxyphenylpyruvate dioxygenase

EC 1.99.2 Oxygenases (now covered by EC 1.13)
 EC 1.99.2.1: deleted, now , lipoxygenase
 EC 1.99.2.2: deleted, now , catechol 1,2-dioxygenase
 EC 1.99.2.3: deleted, now , protocatechuate 3,4-dioxygenase
 EC 1.99.2.4: deleted, now , gentisate 1,2-dioxygenase
 EC 1.99.2.5: deleted, now , homogentisate 1,2-dioxygenase
 EC 1.99.2.6: deleted, now , inositol oxygenase

References

EC1
Hydrolases